= Castilian-Leonese cuisine =

Cuisine of the Castile and León region of Spain

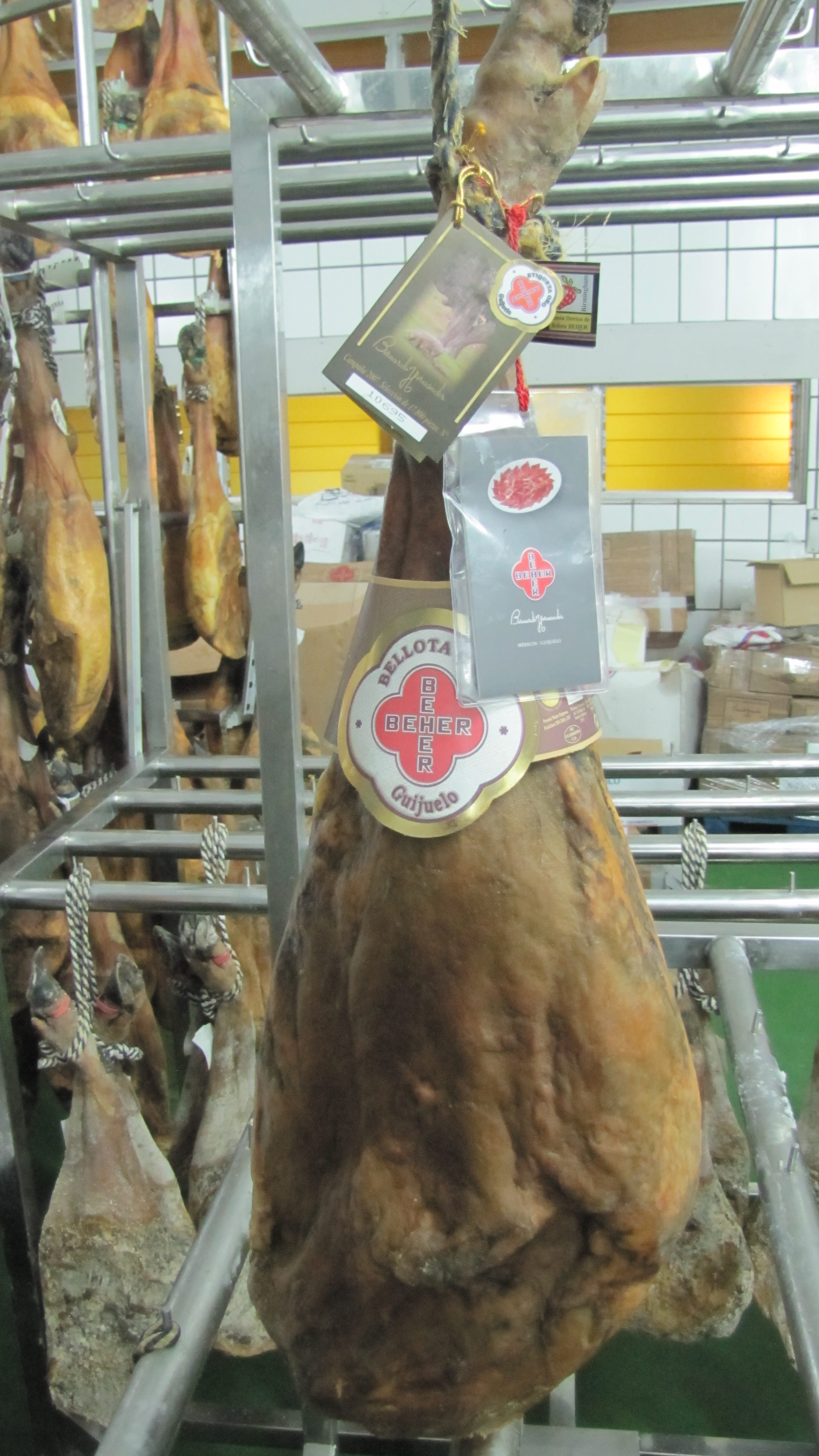
Jamón Ibérico, BEHER "Bellota Oro", was elected as "Best ham in the world" in IFFA Delicat 2007 and 2010.

Castilian-Leonese cuisine refers to the typical dishes and ingredients of the region of Castile and León in Spain. This cuisine is known for its cooked dishes (guiso) and its grilled or roasted meats (asado), its high-quality wines, the variety of its desserts, its sausages (embutidos), and its cheeses.

In addition, in certain areas of Castile and León, one can find the important production of apples, almond paste, and more.

Castilian-Leonese cuisine is built around stews and asados, as well as a large assortment of desserts. The major dishes in this cuisine are of veal, morcillas, legumes (such as green beans, chickpeas, and lentils), simple soups with garlic, and select wines. Other major dishes include pork and embutidos, found all over Castile and León, but that reach their peak in Salamanca (specifically in Guijuelo and Candelario); several types of empanadas; roast lamb and suckling pig; morcilla; haricots; cocido maragato (eaten in reverse order); botillo of Bierzo; jamón from Guijuelo; and queso castellano (a sheep's-milk cheese).

Major wines in Castilian-Leonese cuisine include the robust wine of Toro, reds from Ribera del Duero, whites from Rueda, and clarets from Cigales.

== Some typical dishes ==
- Sopas de ajo
- Cordero asado

Ávila

- Chuletón de Ávila
- Yemas de Santa Teresa
- Patatas revolconas
- Hornazo
- Judías de El Barco de Ávila
- Cuchifrito
- Tostón asado o cochinillo

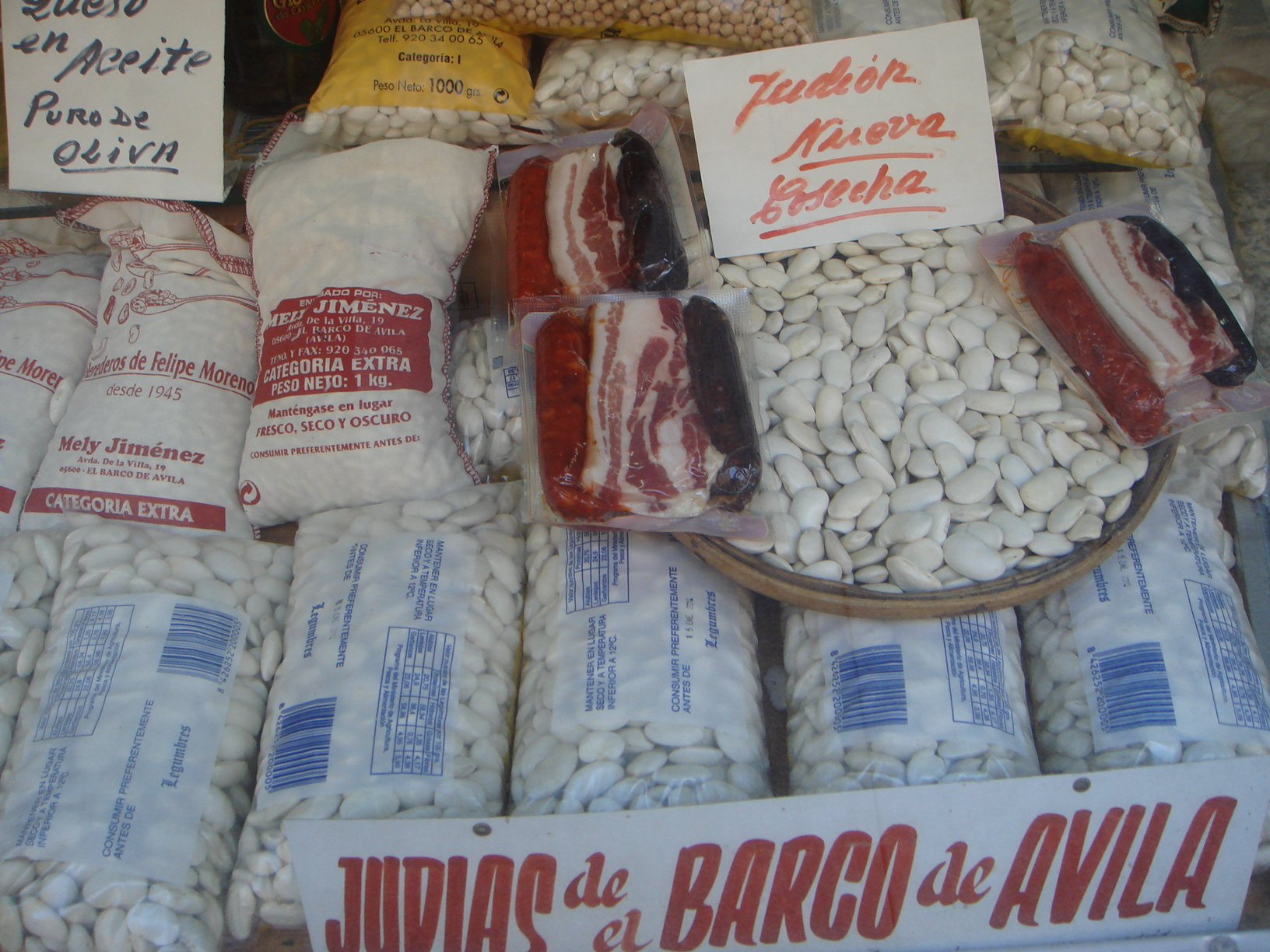
Beans of El Barco de Ávila

Burgos

- Morcilla de Burgos
- Lechazo (Ribera del Duero)
- Chuleta de cordero (Ribera del Duero)
- Olla podrida
- Queso de Burgos

León

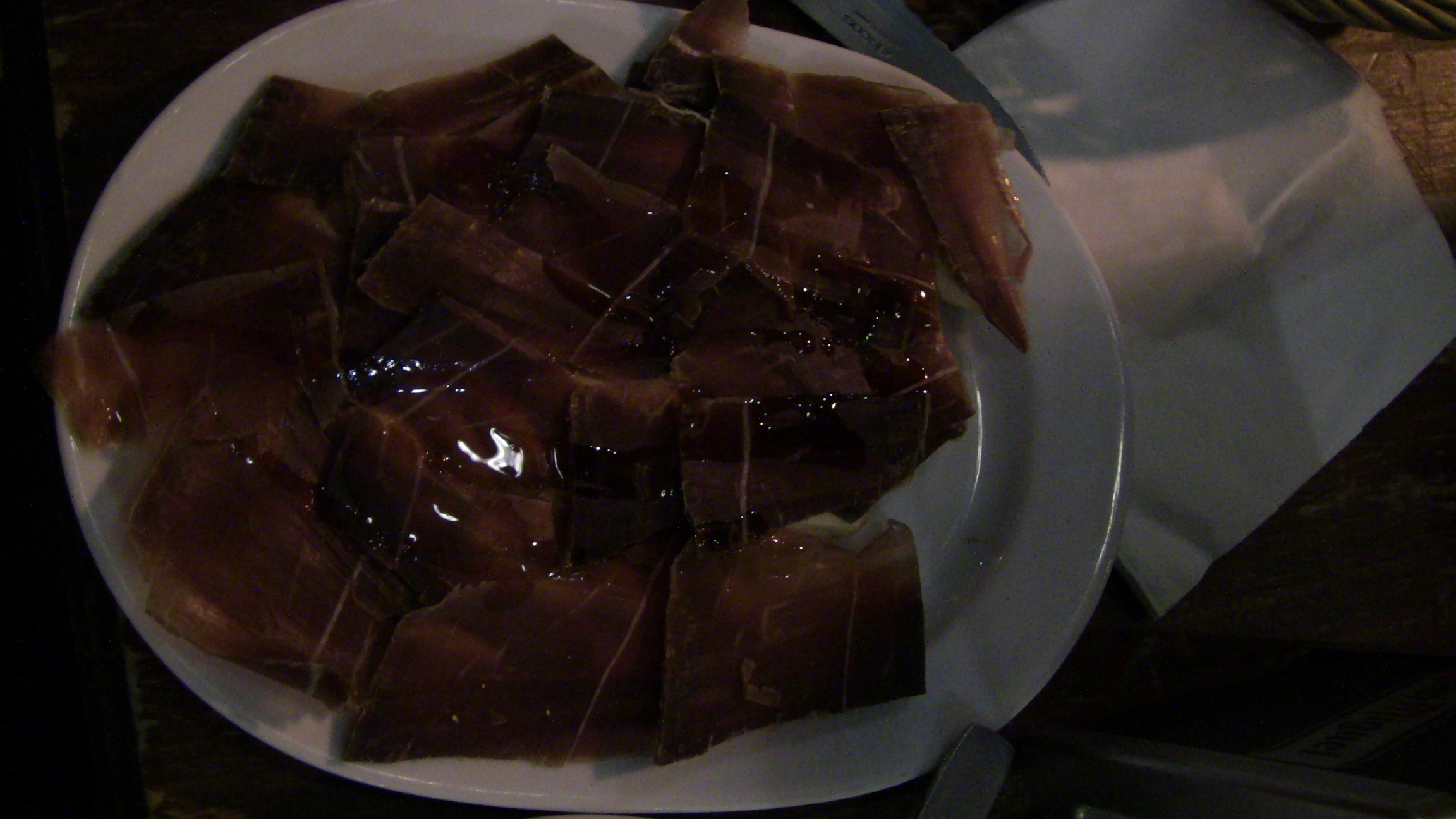
Cecina as served in a restaurant

- Botillo
- Cecina
- Morcilla de León
- Valdeón cheese
- Sopas de ajo leonesas
- Vino de Tierra de León
- Cocido maragato

Palencia

- Menestra de verduras
- Lechazo asado
- Patatas a la importancia
- Cangrejos de río con tomate
- Morcilla de Fuenteandrino

Salamanca

- Hornazo
- Tostón asado o cochinillo
- Limones
- Amarguillos
- Chochos de yema
- Farinato

Segovia

- Cochinillo asado o tostón
- Ponche segoviano
- Judiones de la Granja
- Chorizo de Cantimpalos
- Lechazo asado

Soria

- Torreznos
- Culeca
- Chanfaina
- Perdices y codornices escabechadas

Valladolid

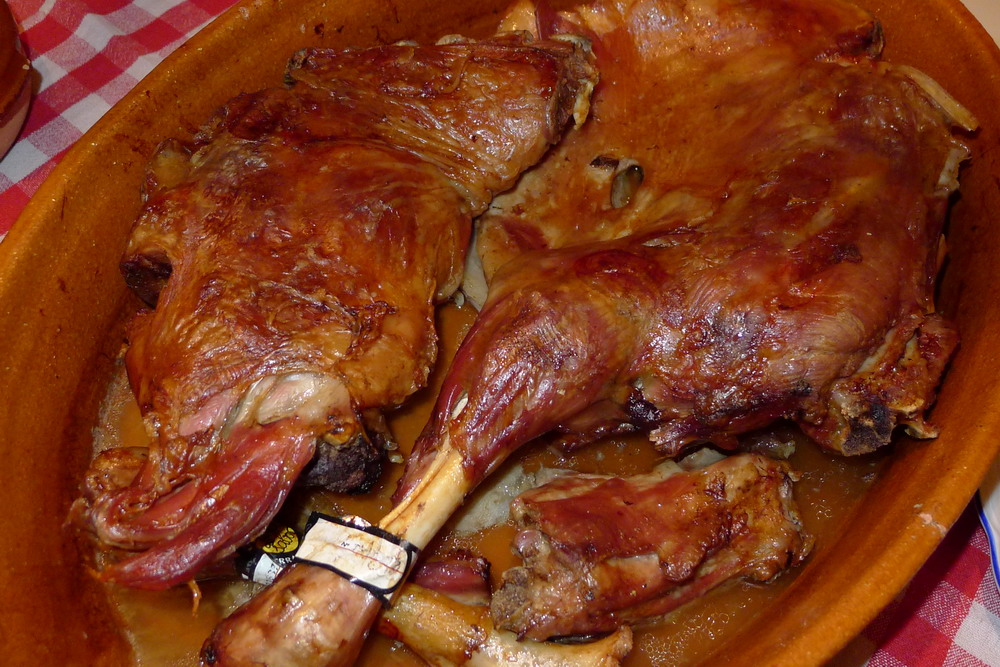
The lechazo asado (roast lechazo -lamb-), is a very typical dish from the province, and others like the Cochinillo asado (roast suckling pig).

- Lechazo asado
- Mantecados de Portillo
- Morcilla de Valladolid
- Gallo turresilano
- Salchichas de Zaratán
- Vino de Cigales (Wine of Cigales)
- Vino de Ribera de Duero (Wine of Ribera de Duero)
- Vino de Rueda (Wine of Rueda)
- Vino de Tierra de León (Wine of Tierra de León)
- Vino of Toro (Wine of Toro)

Zamora

- Rebojo
- Arroz a la zamorana

== See also ==
- Lechazo de Castilla y León

== External links (in Spanish) ==
- Patrimonio Gastronómico de Castilla y León
- Alimentos de Castilla y León
- D.O. Cigales
- D.O. Ribera del Duero
- D.O. Rueda
- D.O. Tierra de León
- D.O. Toro
