= Cuisine of Valladolid =

Typical gastronomy of Valladolid, Spain

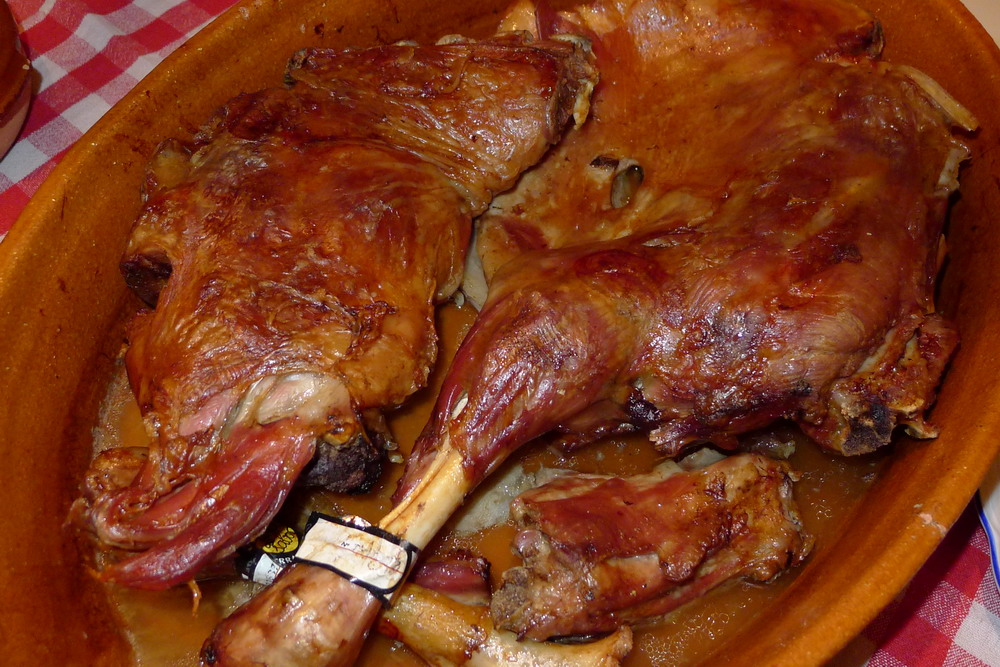
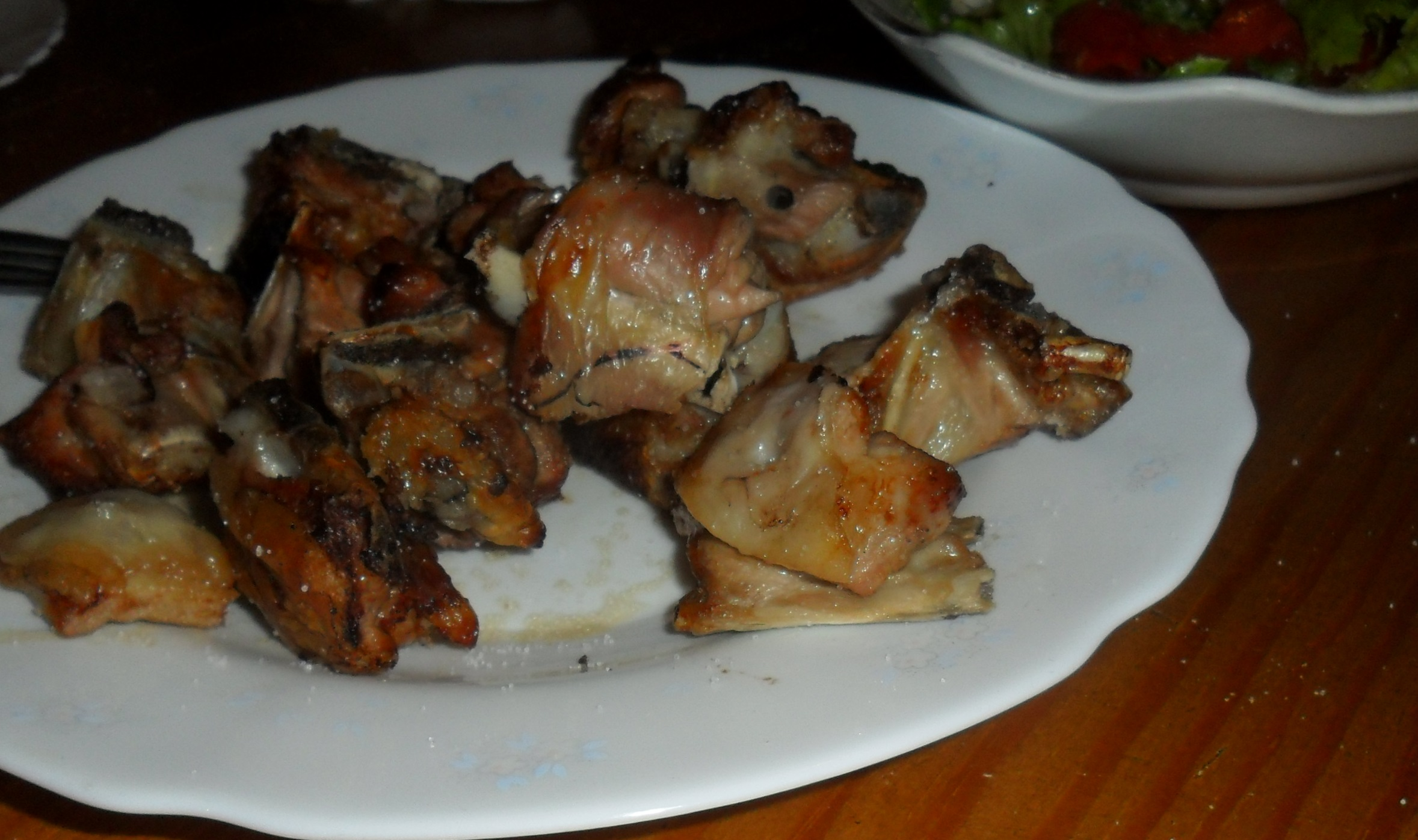
Lechazo asado (roast lamb), shown above, is a typical dish from the province. On left a dish of lechazo and on the right a dish of pincho de lechazo.

The gastronomy of the province of Valladolid comprises the meals, their preparation, and the culinary habits of the province of Valladolid (Castile and León, Spain). It is based on barbecued and roast food, especially roasted Spanish cuisine, complemented by wines.

== Ingredients ==
=== Cereals ===
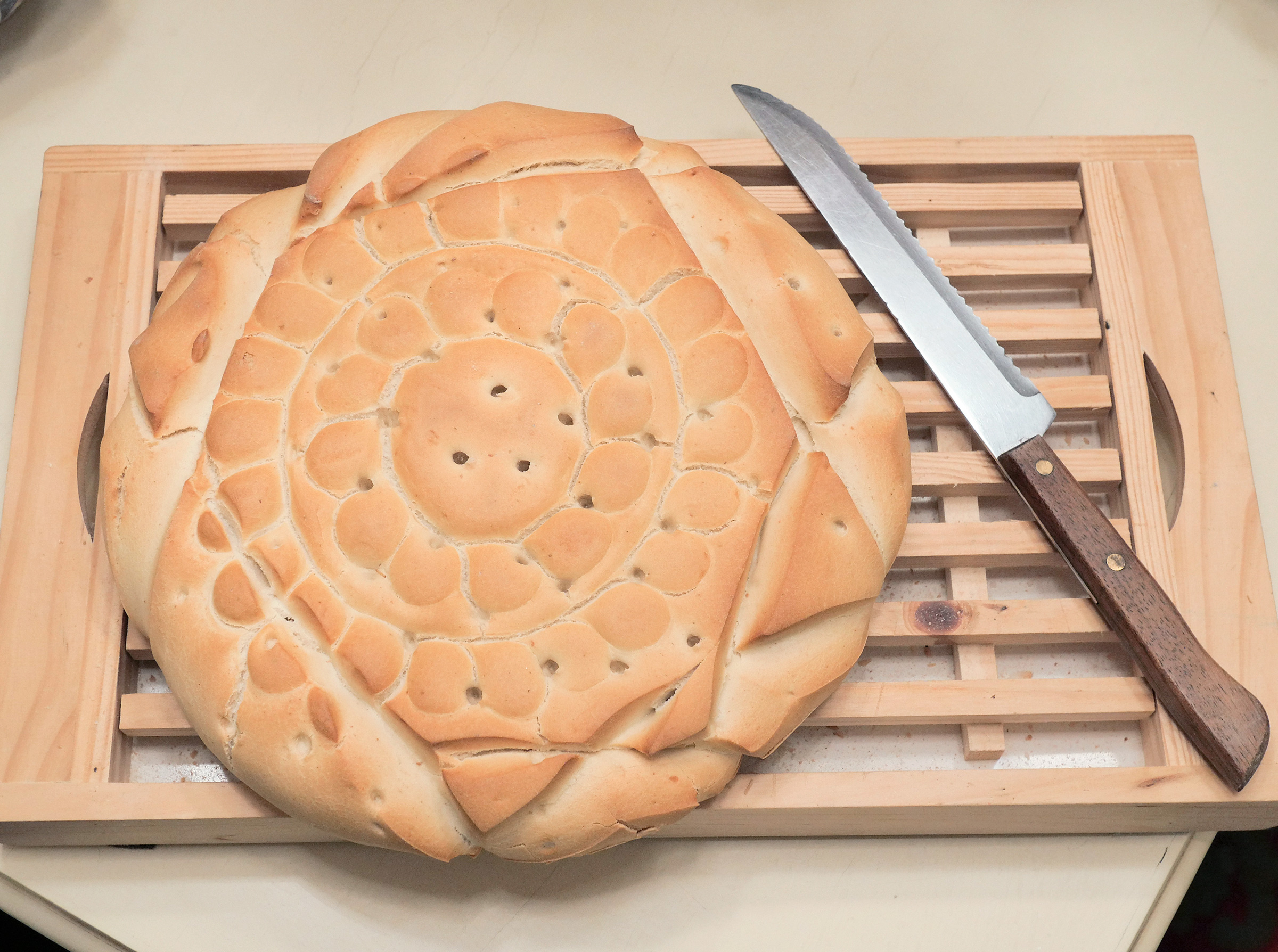
Lechuguino Bread. The bread made in the province has a tradition that goes back to the 9th century.

A large amount and variety of cereals (wheat, maize, barley, rye) are grown locally and supply the preparers of distinctive local breads.

=== Vegetables ===
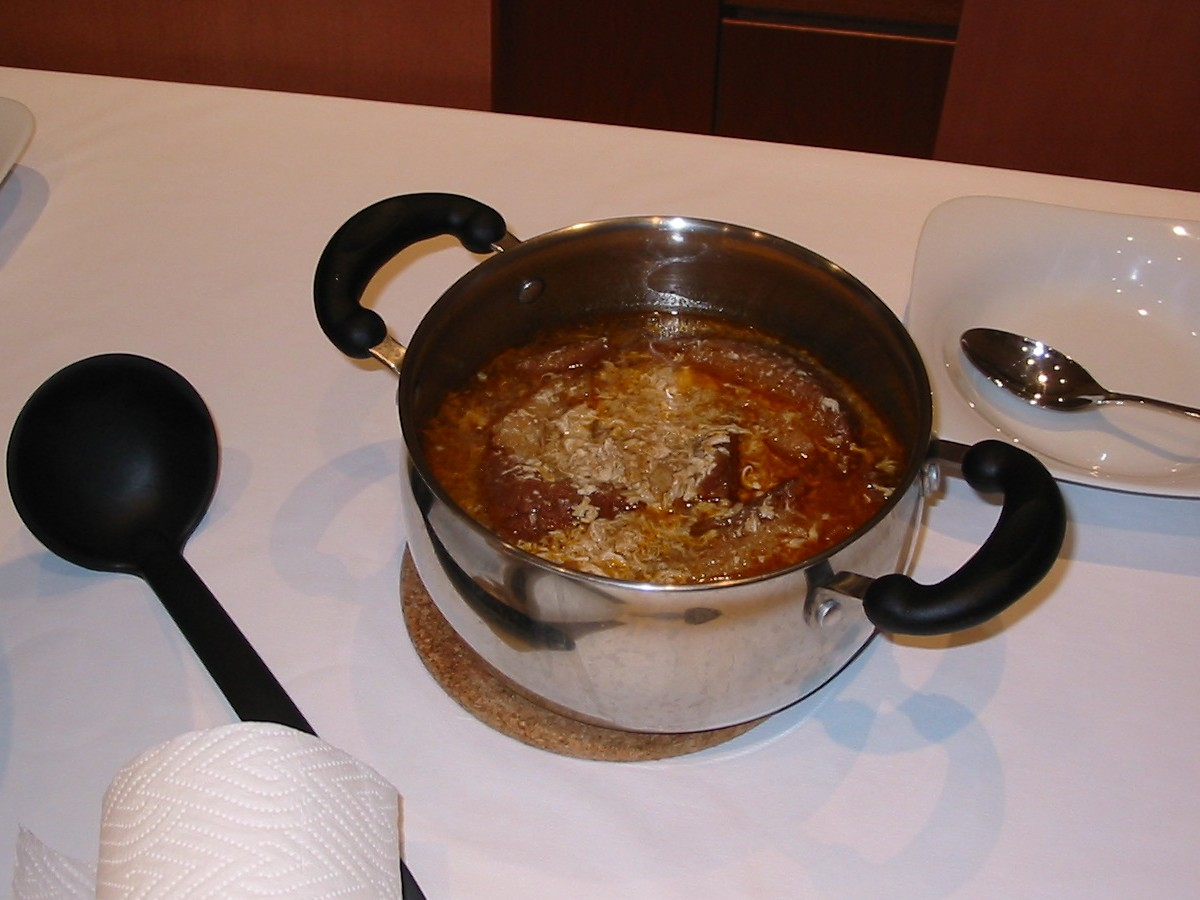
Sopa de ajo (garlic soup)

Distinctive vegetable dishes of Valladolid cuisine include sopa de chícharos (or guisantes), a pea soup with spearmint added in for flavoring (in Spanish, pea is guisante or chícharo); coliflor al ajoarriero (cauliflower in garlic); legumes in dishes such as alubias con patuño de cerdo (beans with pork leg); with cereals the pans and derivatives such as sopa de ajo (garlic soup) and the sopa de bestia cansada (soup of tired beast) of Medina del Campo. It is an area known for ajoarrieros (which means mule driver's garlics), for example ajo de Vallelado (garlic of Vallelado).

=== Cheeses ===
The animal husbandry of the province produces notable local cheeses including the queso de Villalón (cheese of Villalon), similar to queso de Burgos.

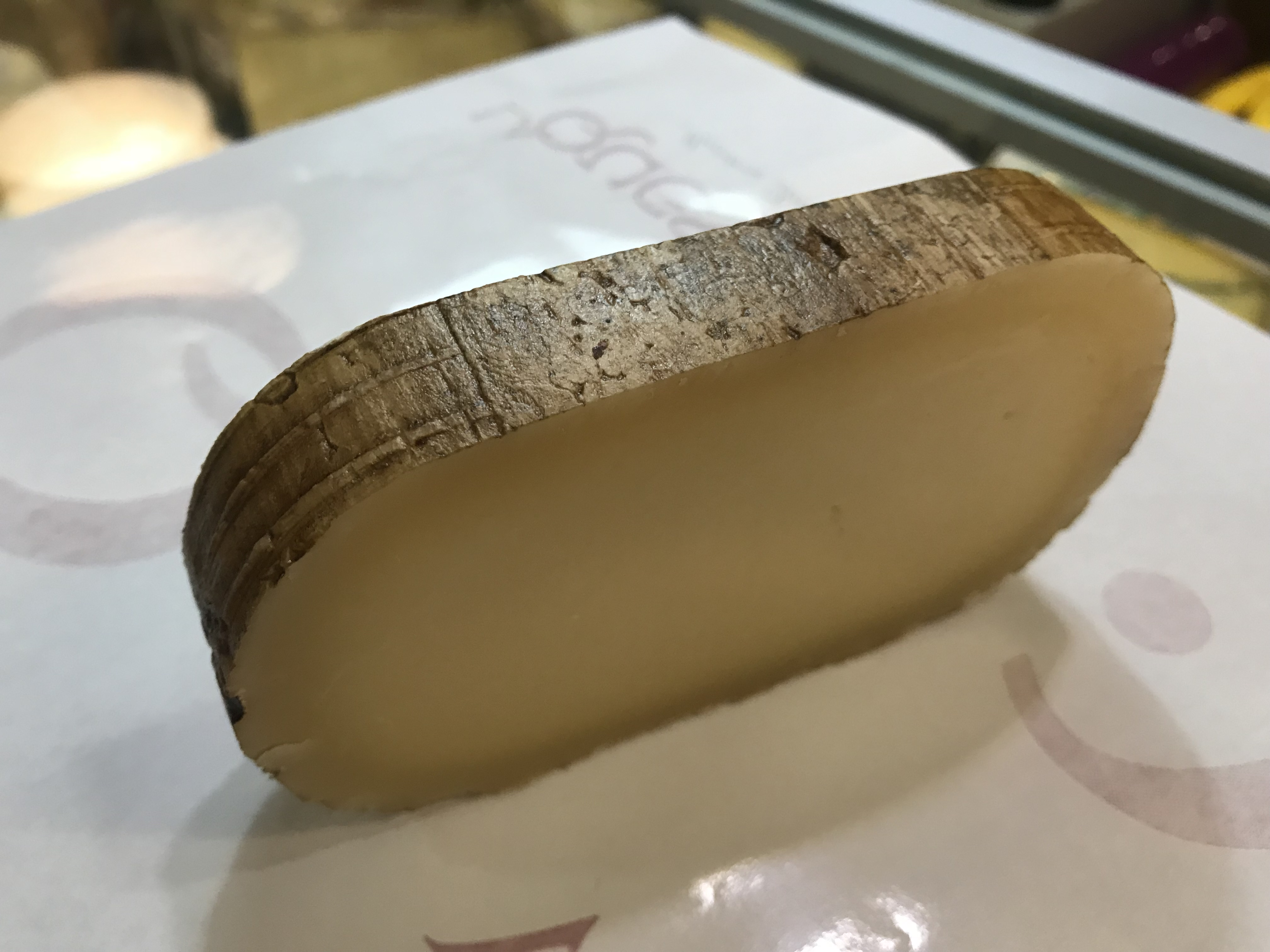
Queso pata de mulo (Cheese mule leg).

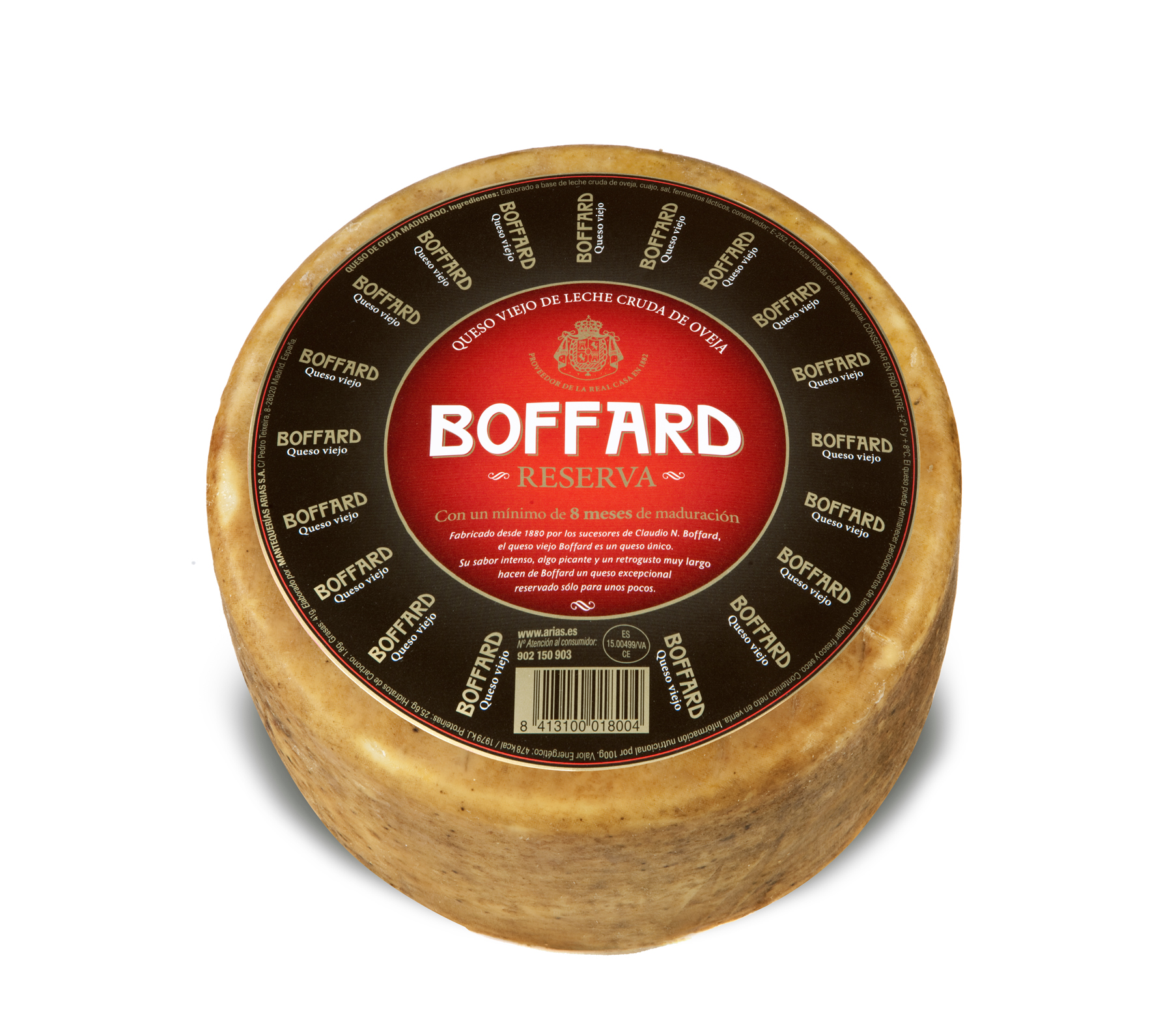
Cheese of Boffard

=== Meats ===
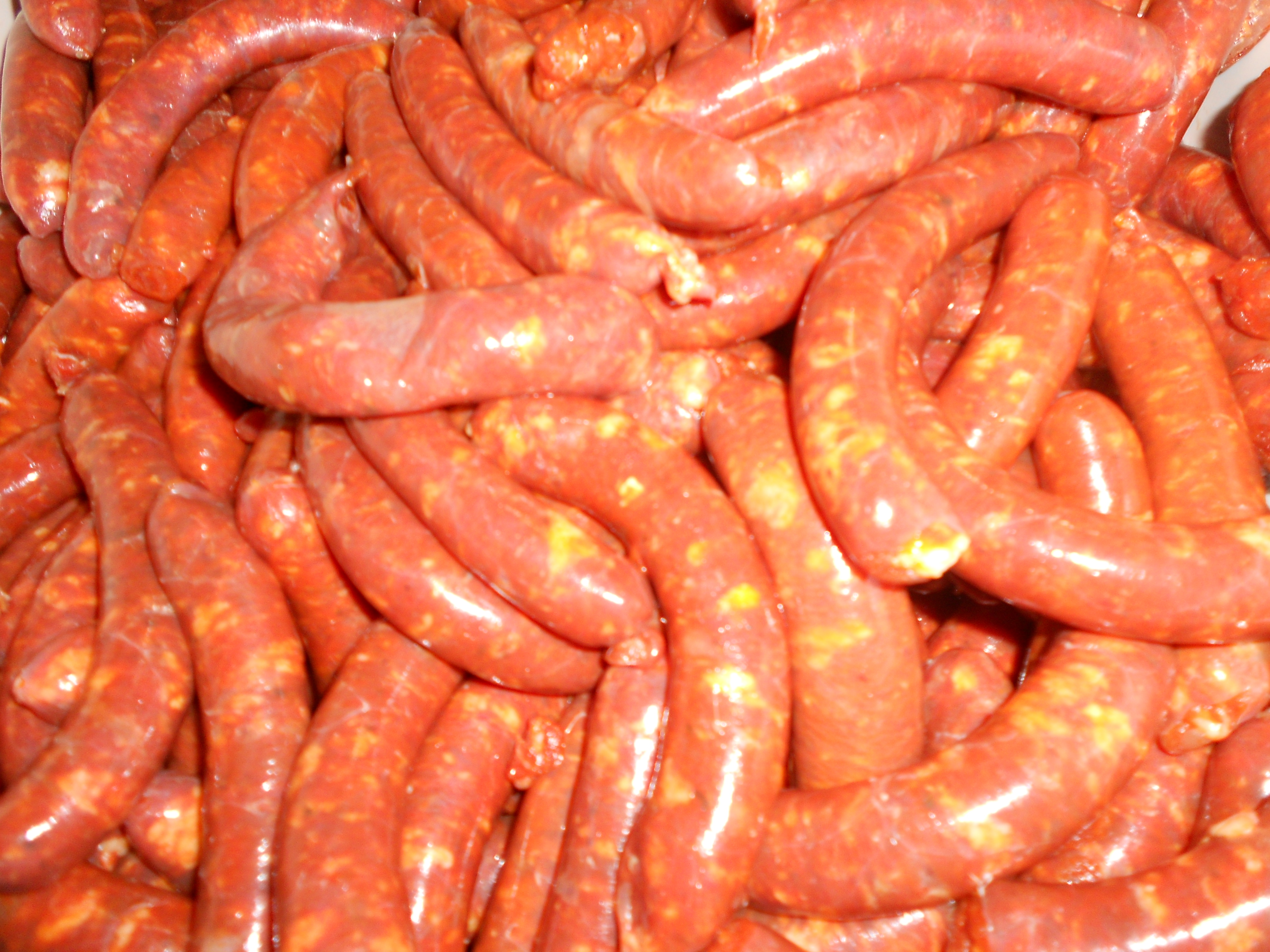
Red and white sausages from Zaratán.

Meats and sausages in the region are famous for their unique flavors. The province is in an area known for Spanish-style barbecueed roasts.

Dishes include lechazo asado (roast veal or lamb), cochinillo asado (roast suckling pig), cordero asado (roast lamb), morcilla (blood sausage or black pudding), asados al Sarmiento (roasted meat with wine), a typical dish in Santibáñez de Valcorba and environs, chuletones de buey (a large ox steak) with ajillo (garlic), typical in Peñafiel, and beef tojunto ("all together" stew) like "tojunto of Castile" (influenced by the gastronomy of Aragon). The embutido (sausage) called chitas is well known, prepared with the meat of suckling pig in adobo.

Other pork-based sausages include morcilla de Valladolid (black pudding from Valladolid spiced with a special kind of onion) and salchichas (sausages) from Zaratán. Chorizo is also used in dishes such as tortilla de chorizo (chorizo omelette).

Of the smaller game, there are preparations such as the conejo a la cazadora (rabbit to the hunter).

=== Seafood ===
Among the typical fish dishes of the region, like other Castilian provinces there are characteristic trout dishes, an example being the truchas con jamón (trout with ham).

== Confectionery, desserts ==
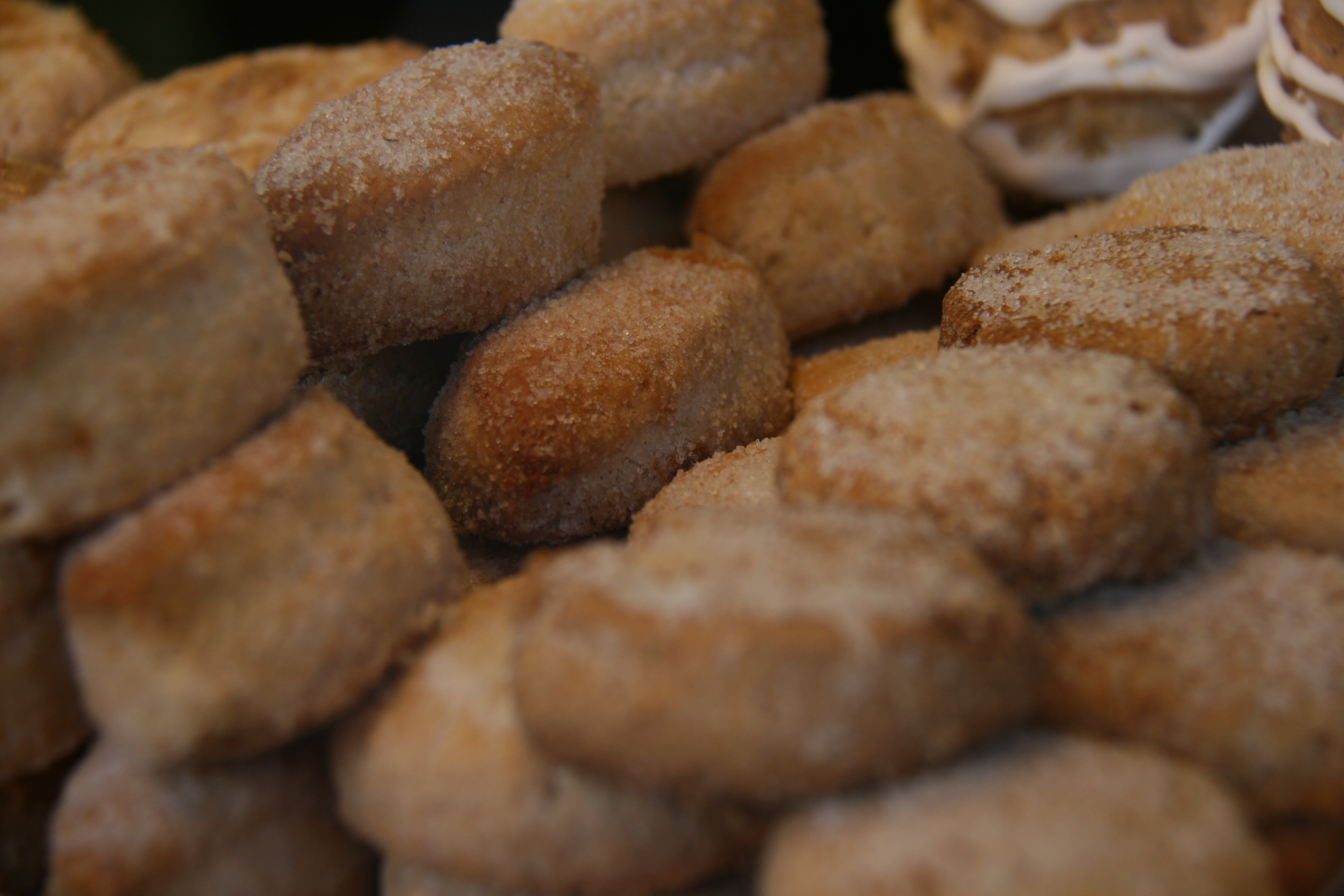
Pastas from Valladolid.

The pastries of the province include specialities such as bolla de chicharrones (pork rind cake), rosquillas de palo (stick donuts), mariquitas (ladybirds), roscados (donuts), mantecados de Portillo, roscos de yema (yolk roscos), rosquillas de trancalapuerta (donuts of trancalapuerta), bizcochos de Santa Clara (Santa Clara cakes) of Tordesillas, hojuelas (flakes), and bizcochos de cura (cakes of cure).

Other generic dessert dishes popular in the province include arroz con leche (rice pudding).

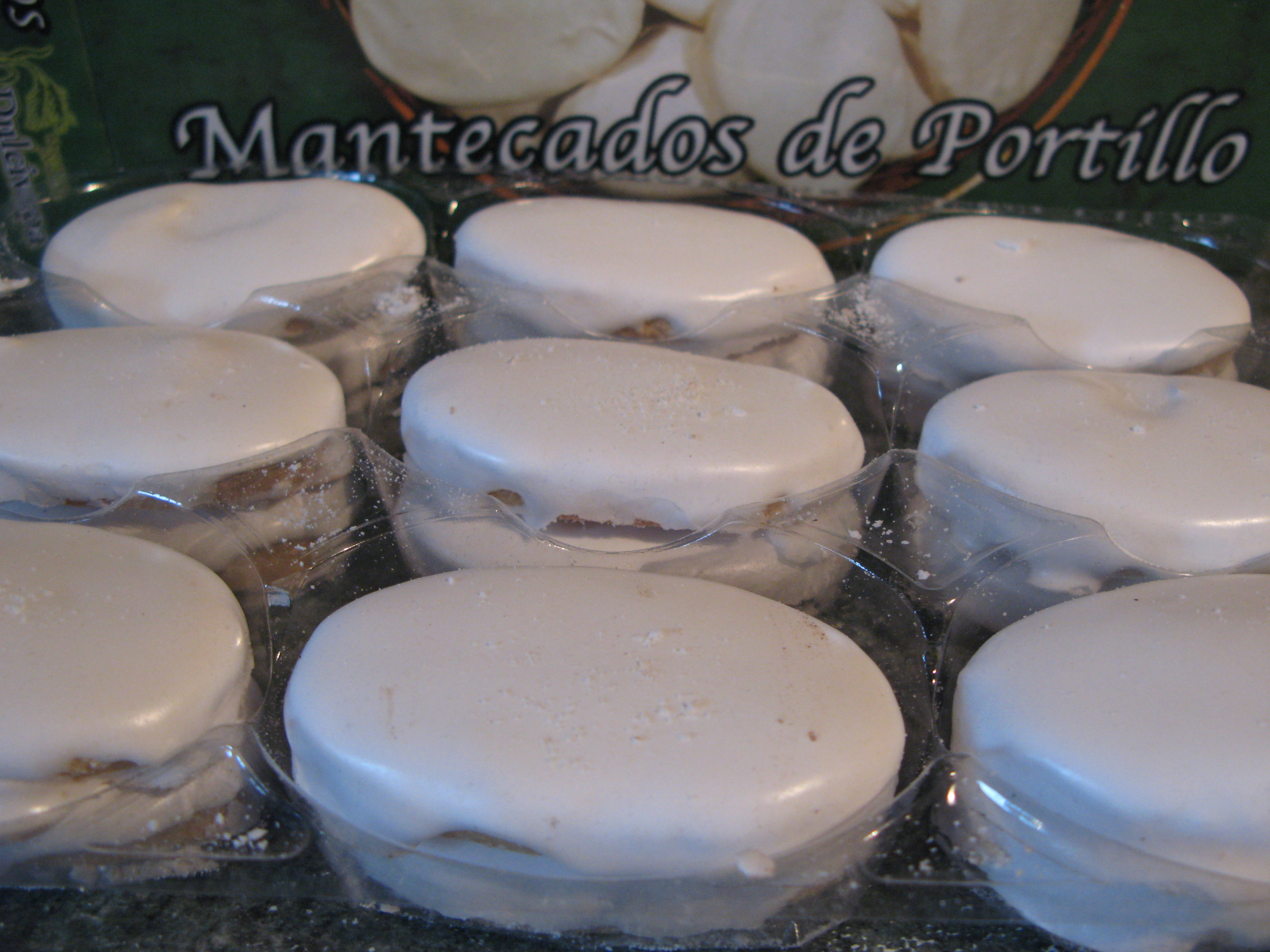
Mantecado of Portillo

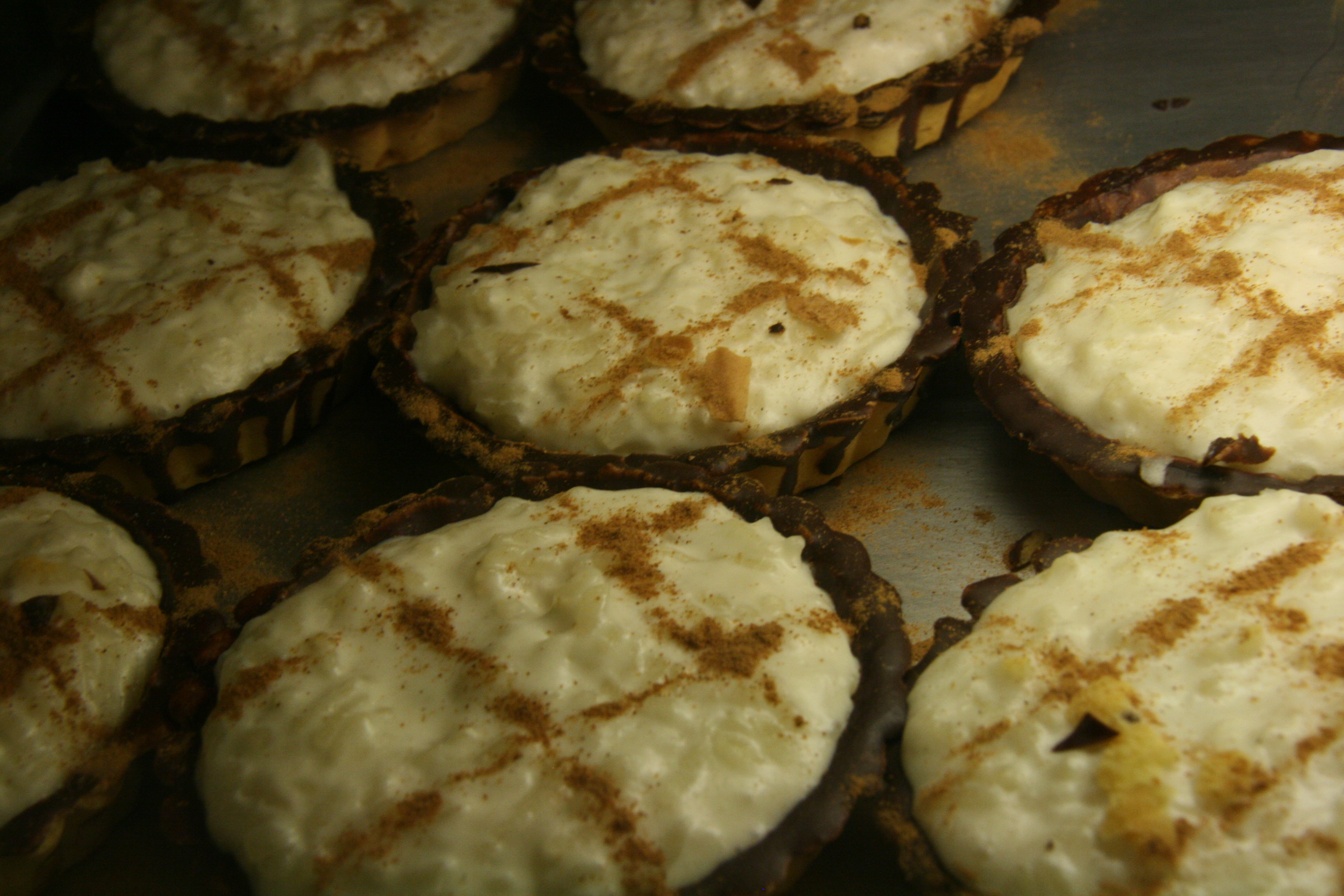
Arroz con leche (rice pudding)

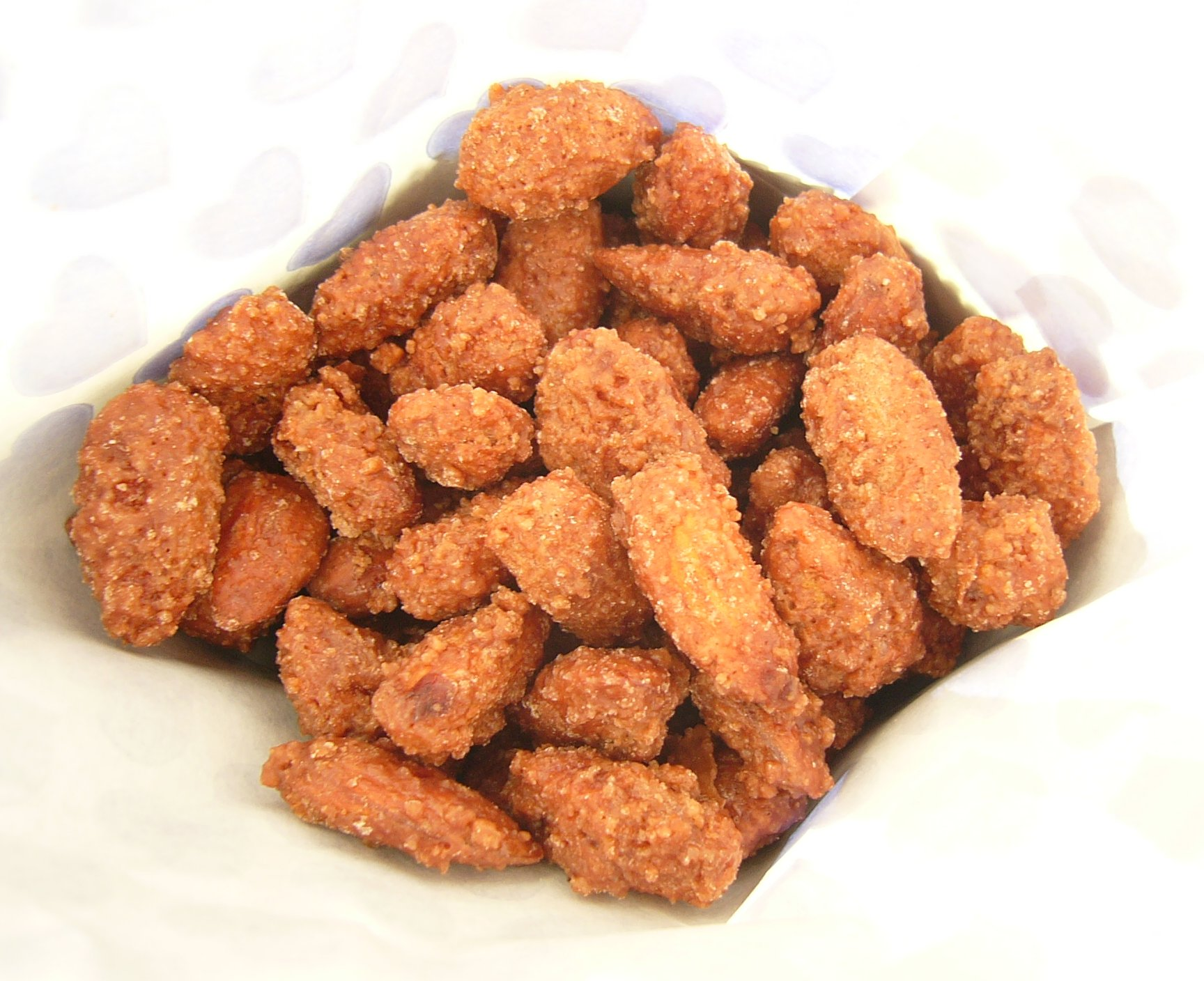
Almendras garrapiñadas (Candied almonds)

== Special dishes ==
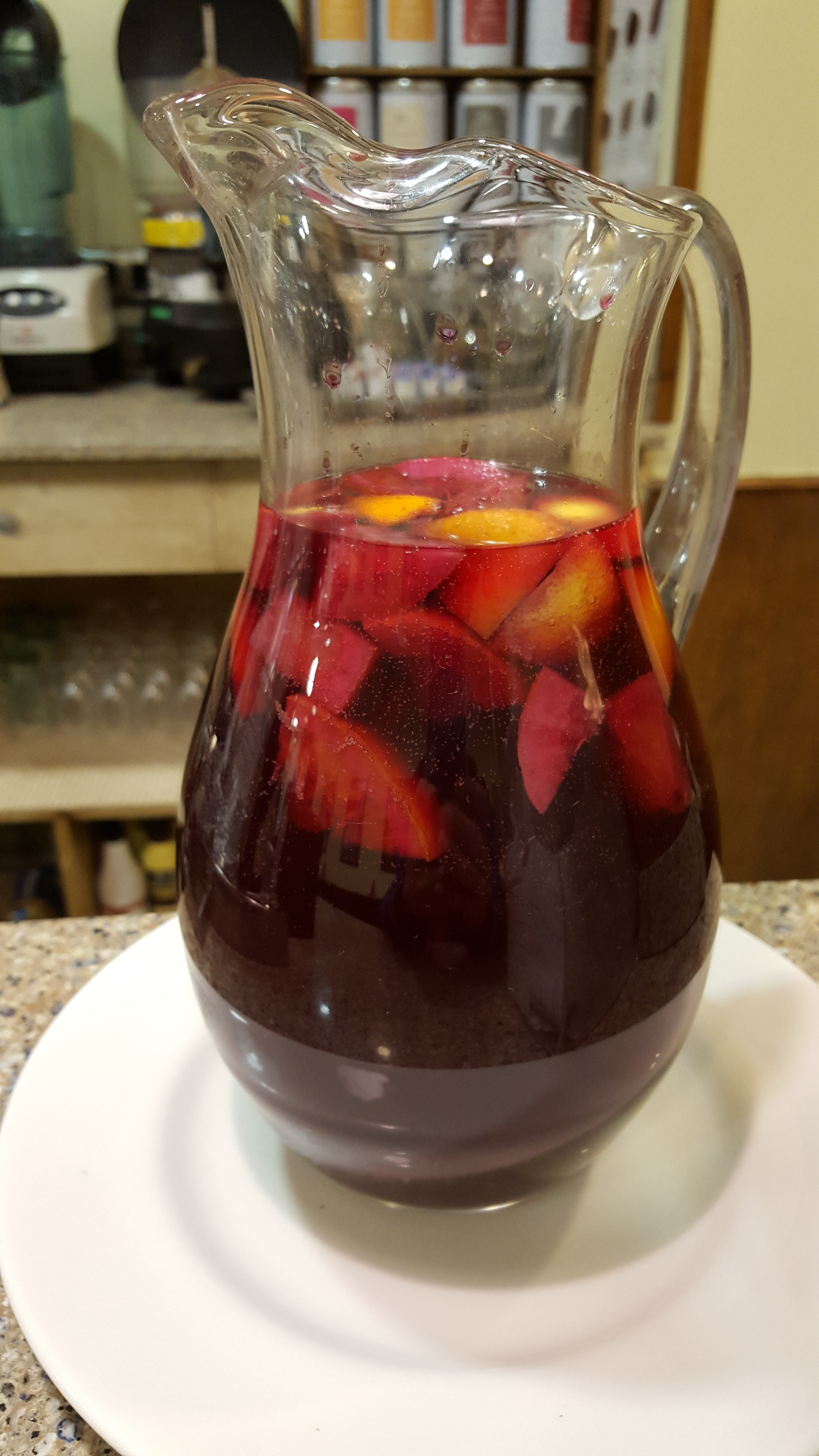
Pitcher of wine lemonade at Easter.

It is common during Holy Week to consume special food that is part of the Easter food (mainly desserts).

On 8 September in Valladolid during the celebration of the Virgen de San Lorenzo, sweets, pastas, pastries and other desserts are usually served, one highlight being the tarta de San Lorenzo (pie of Saint Laurence).

On Halloween and All Saints' Day it is typical to consume products known as Hueso de santo (saint's bones) and buñuelos (similar to fritters).

At Christmas, the Gastronomy of Christmas includes many sweet dishes, such as turrón, the polvorones of Tordesillas, date palm, marzipan, and dragées, and also many savory dishes such as suckling pig, chicken, turkey, capon, lamb and mutton, bream, and prawns (in addition to other seafood).

On 31 December (New Year's Eve) it is a tradition to eat twelve grapes to the rhythm of the first twelve bells of the New Year. In the early morning of 1 January, "chocolate with churros" is often eaten, either at home with families or in a chocolatier, coffeehouse, or bar.

On 6 January (Day of the Three Kings) it is usual to eat the traditional roscón de reyes (king cake).

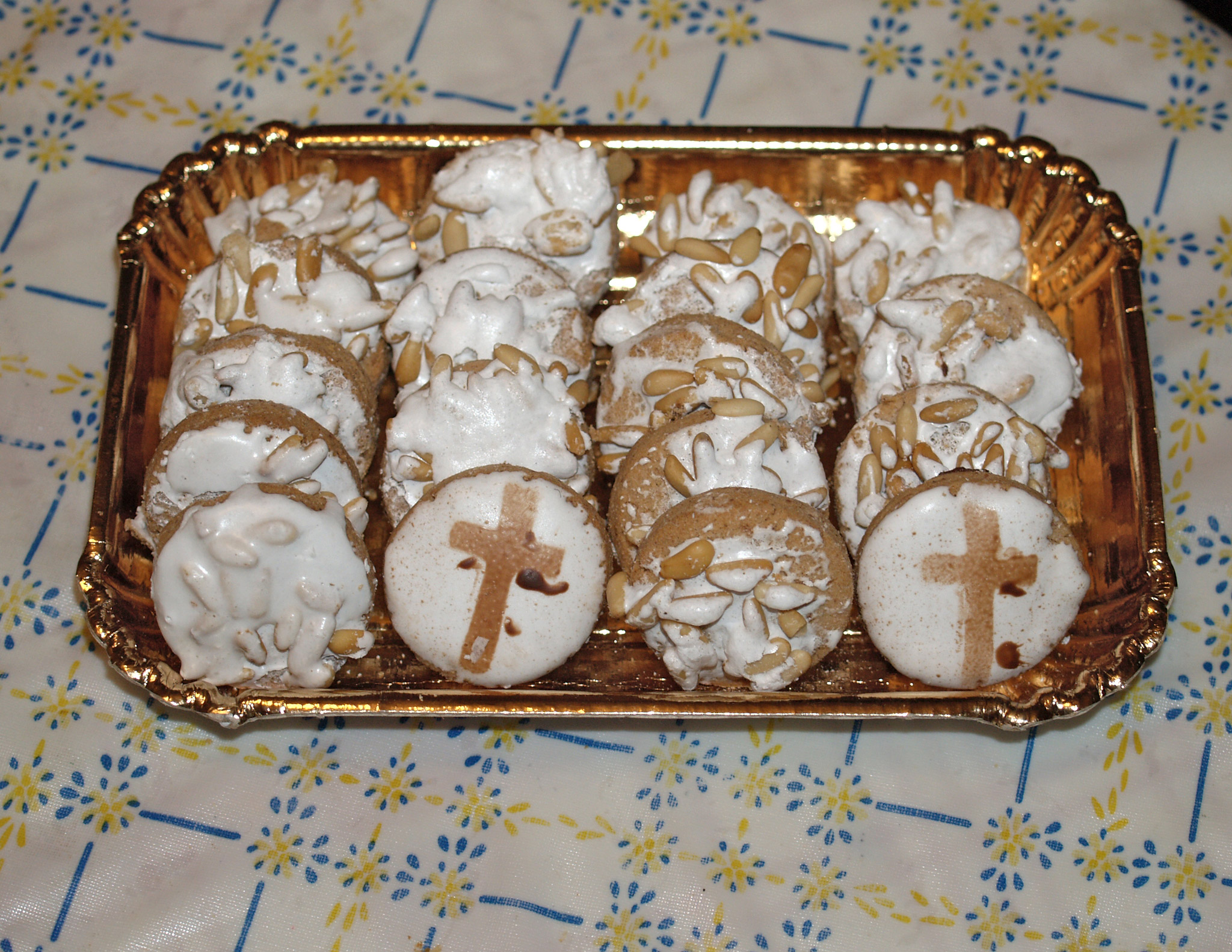
"Pasta of the penitent", one of the food that is part of the Easter food.

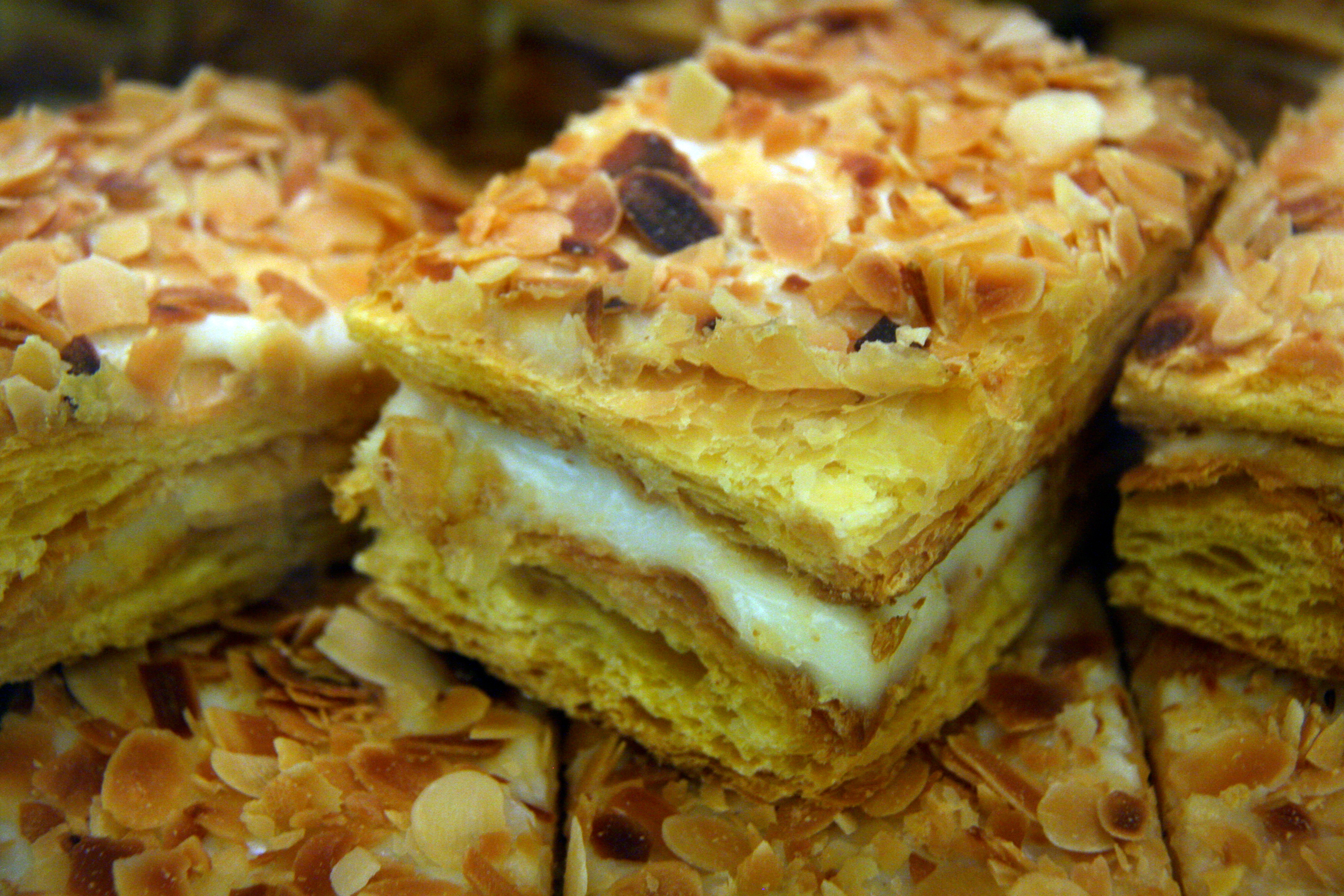
"Puff pastry of San Lorenzo". During the celebration of the Virgen de San Lorenzo, pastas, pastries and other desserts are usually served.

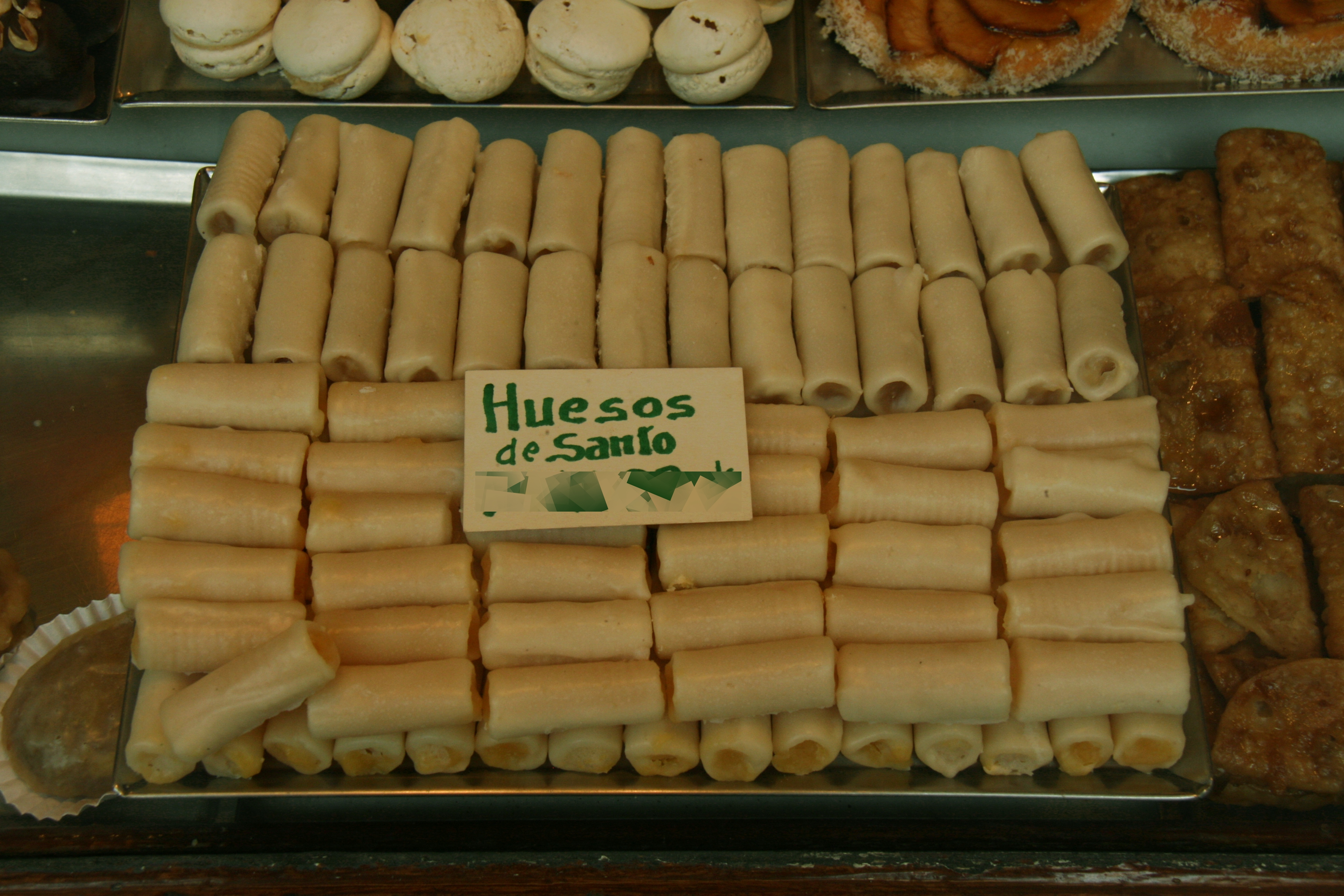
Hueso de santo (saint's bones) and buñuelos (similar to fritters) are very typical of Halloween and All Saints' Day.

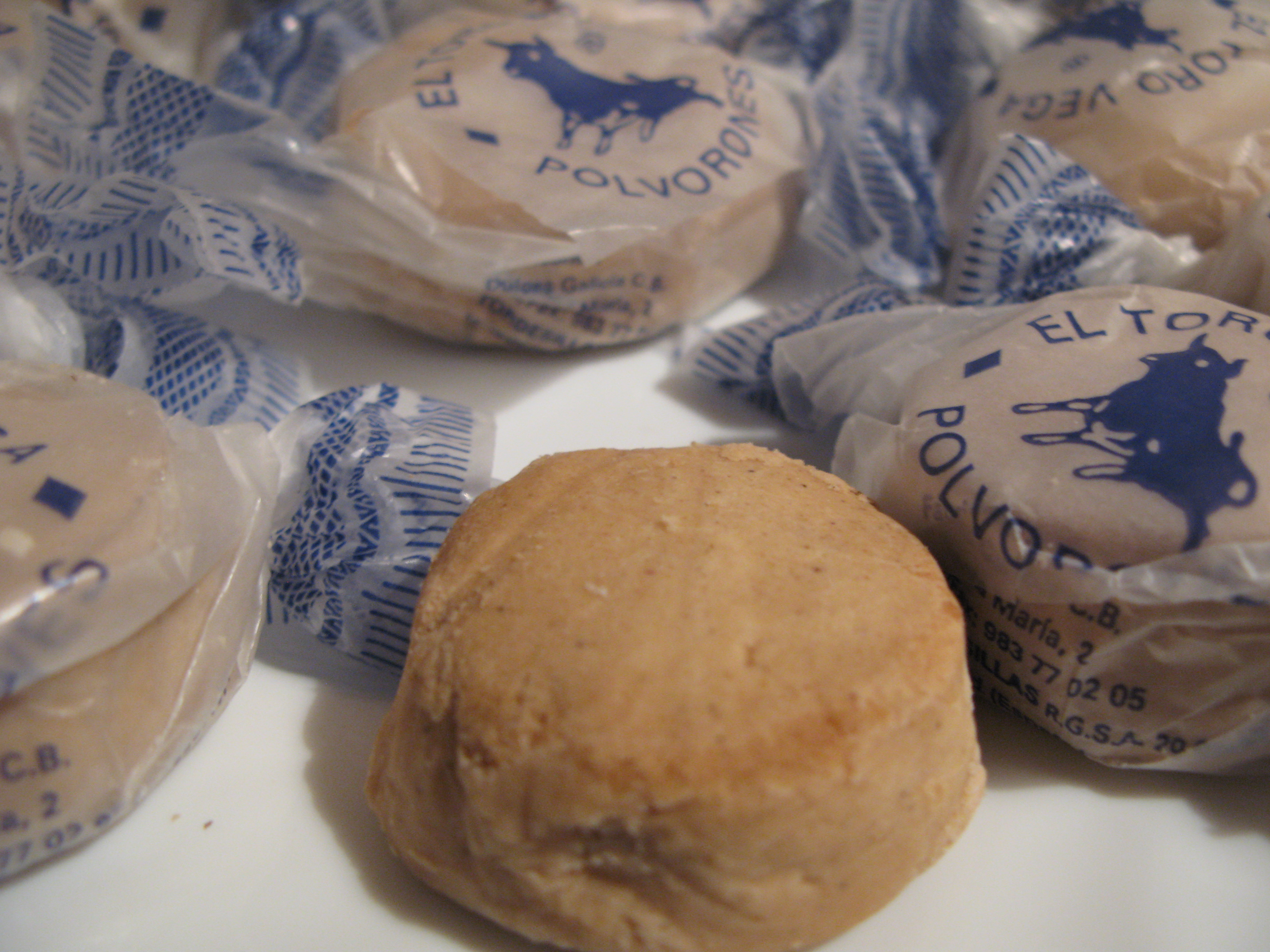
Polvorones of Tordesillas are one of the many typical products of the Gastronomy of Christmas.

== Wines ==
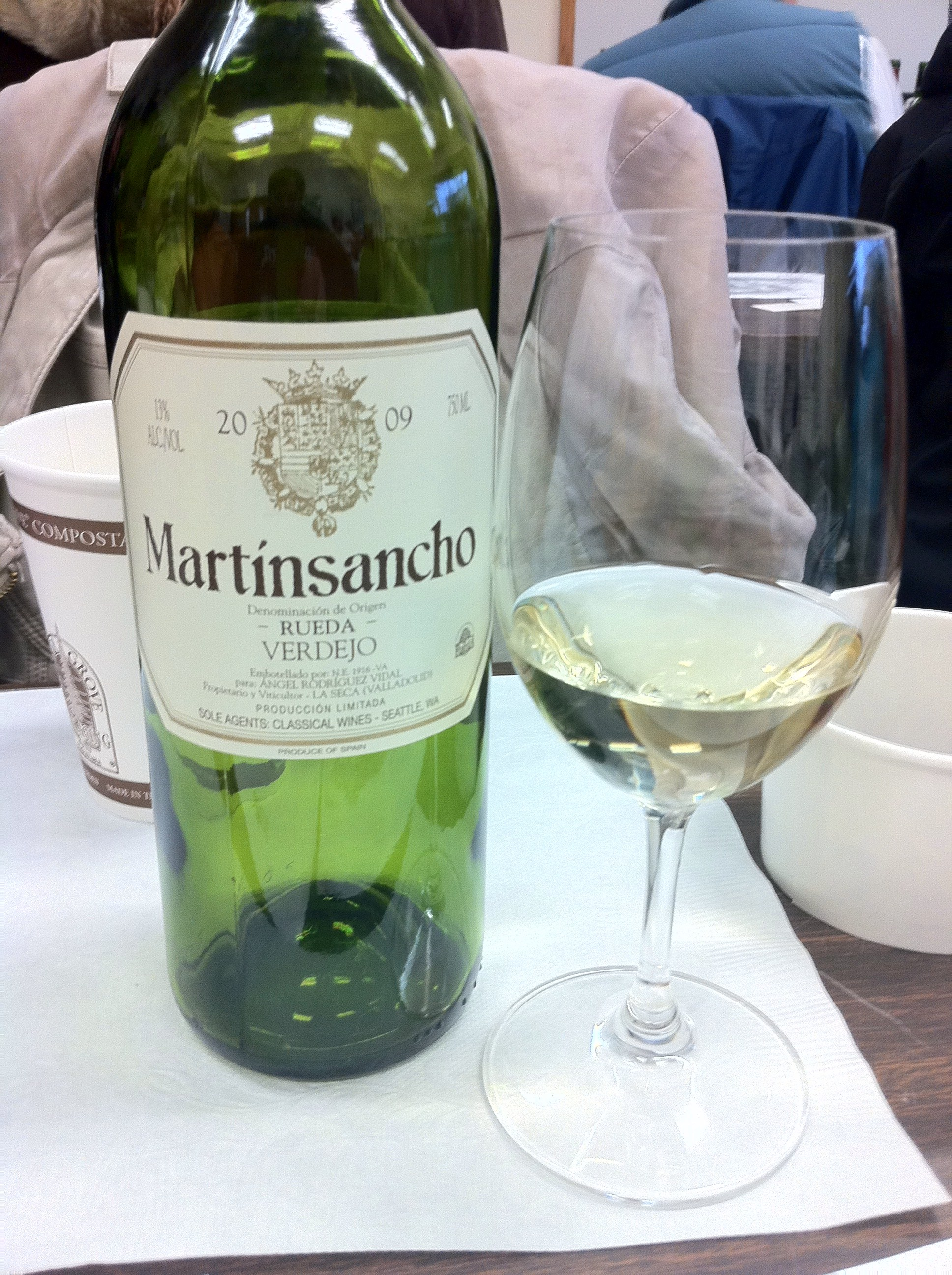
A “Blancos de Rueda” wine made from Verdejo grapes.

Wines from the province of Valladolid are among the most highly regarded in the world due to their reputations for taste and quality. Many of the most famous come from the Vega Sicilia winery. The province has five wines with a denomination of origin. Wines with a Rueda Denomination of Origin were court wines at the time of the Catholic Monarchs. They are produced from a range of verdejo grapes, and to a lesser extent from sauvignon blanc cultivars. Under this appellation there are white, sparkling, red, pink and liquor wines. The wines of Ribera del Duero Designation of Origin are red wines available as young wine, as reserve wine and as old vine. Wines of the Toro Designation of Origin are mainly white, rosé and red; the wines of Tierra de León Denomination of Origin are white, rosé and red; and finally, there are rosé wines of the Cigales Denomination of Origin.

Cigales Denomination of Origin

Ribera del Duero Denomination of Origin

Rueda Denomination of Origin

Toro Denomination of Origin

Tierra de León Denomination of Origin

== Summary list of typical products ==
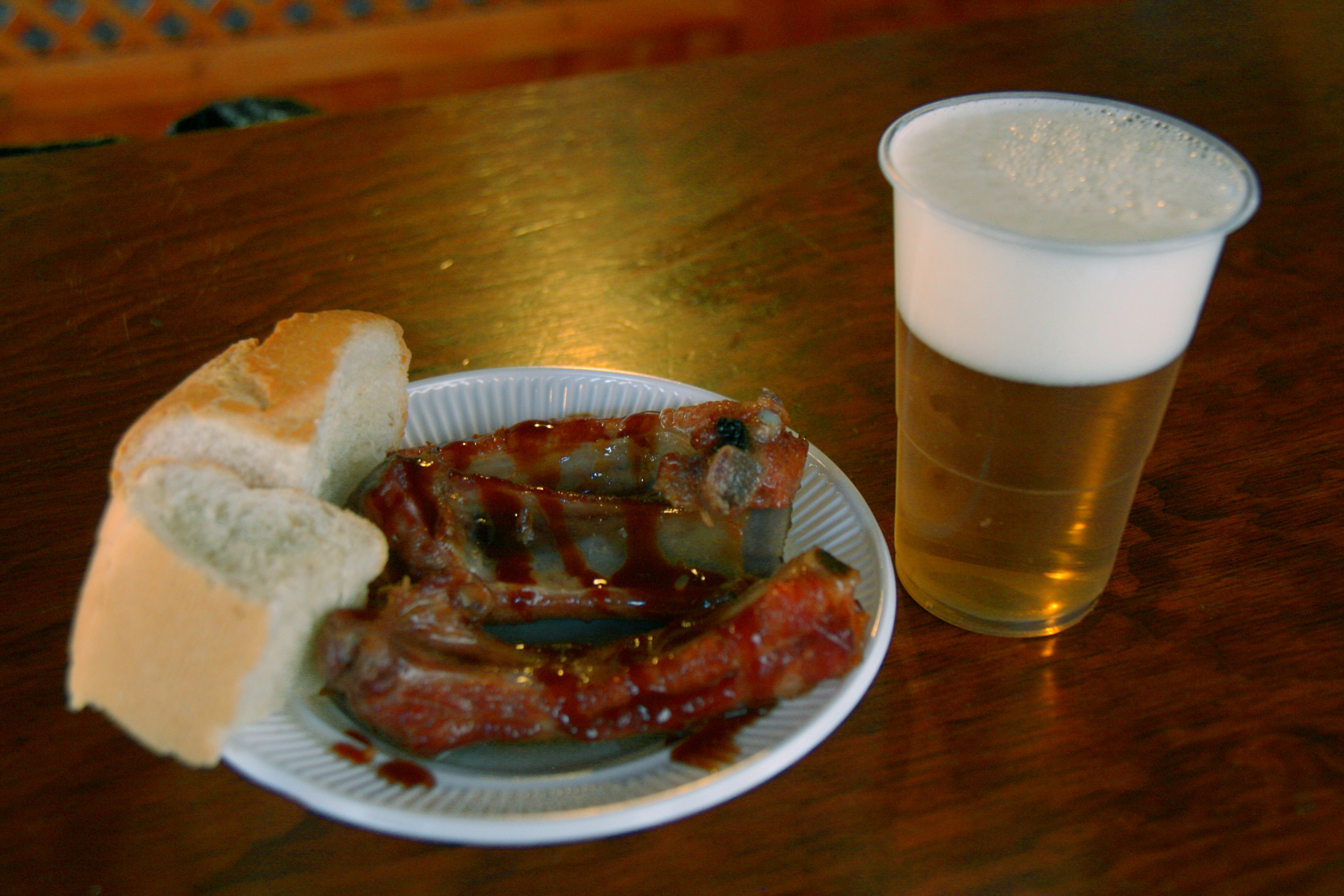
A tapas. The national tapas contest in Valladolid is the only one held in Spain.

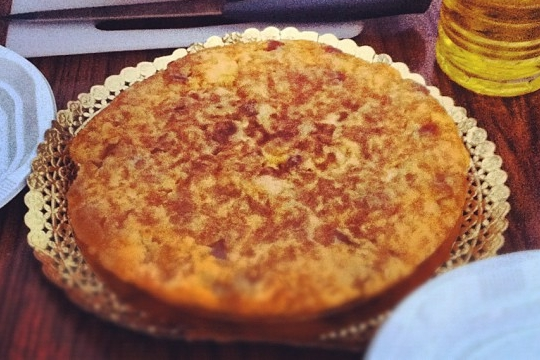
Tortilla de chorizo (chorizo omelette)

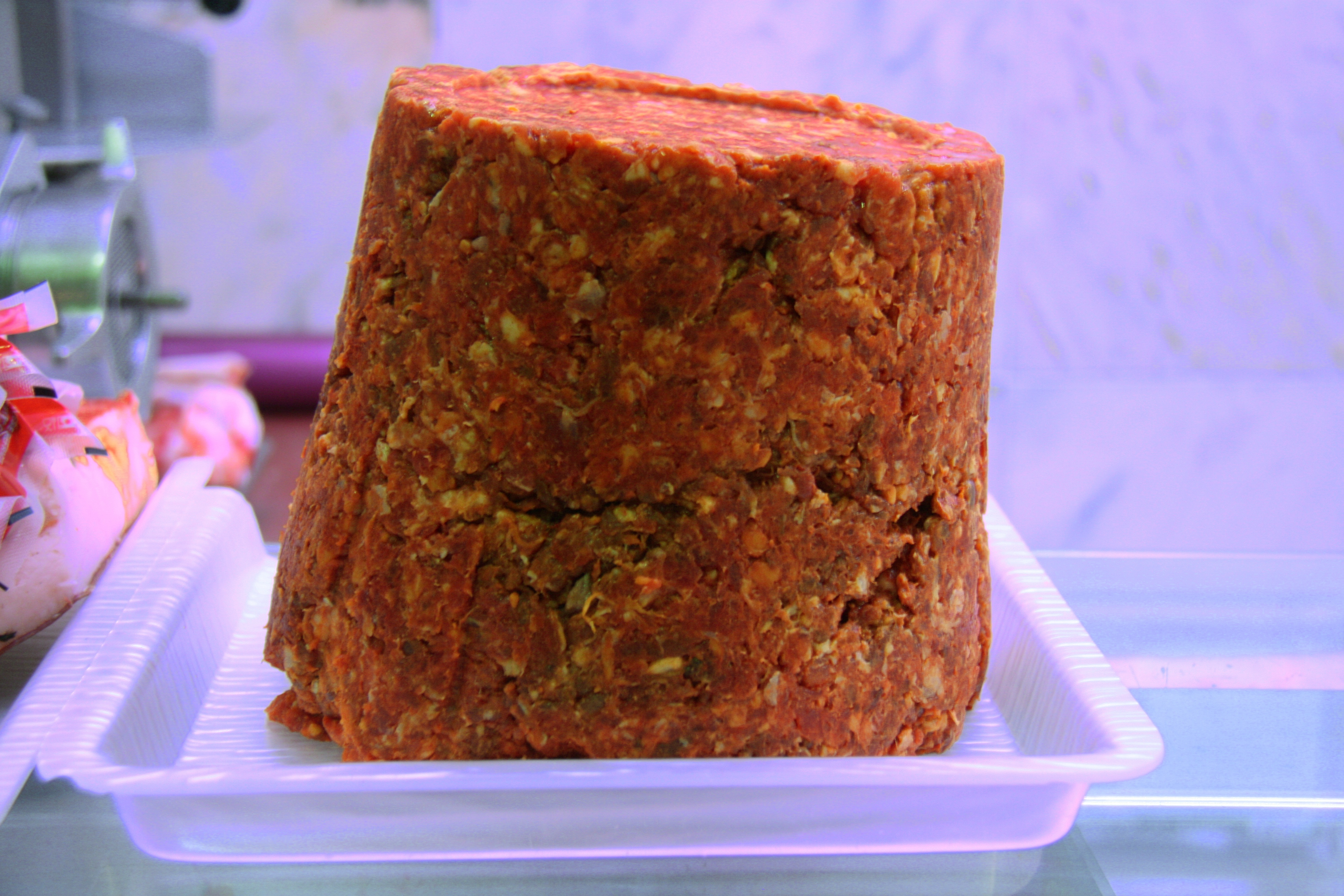
Block of jijas (minced chorizo sausage).

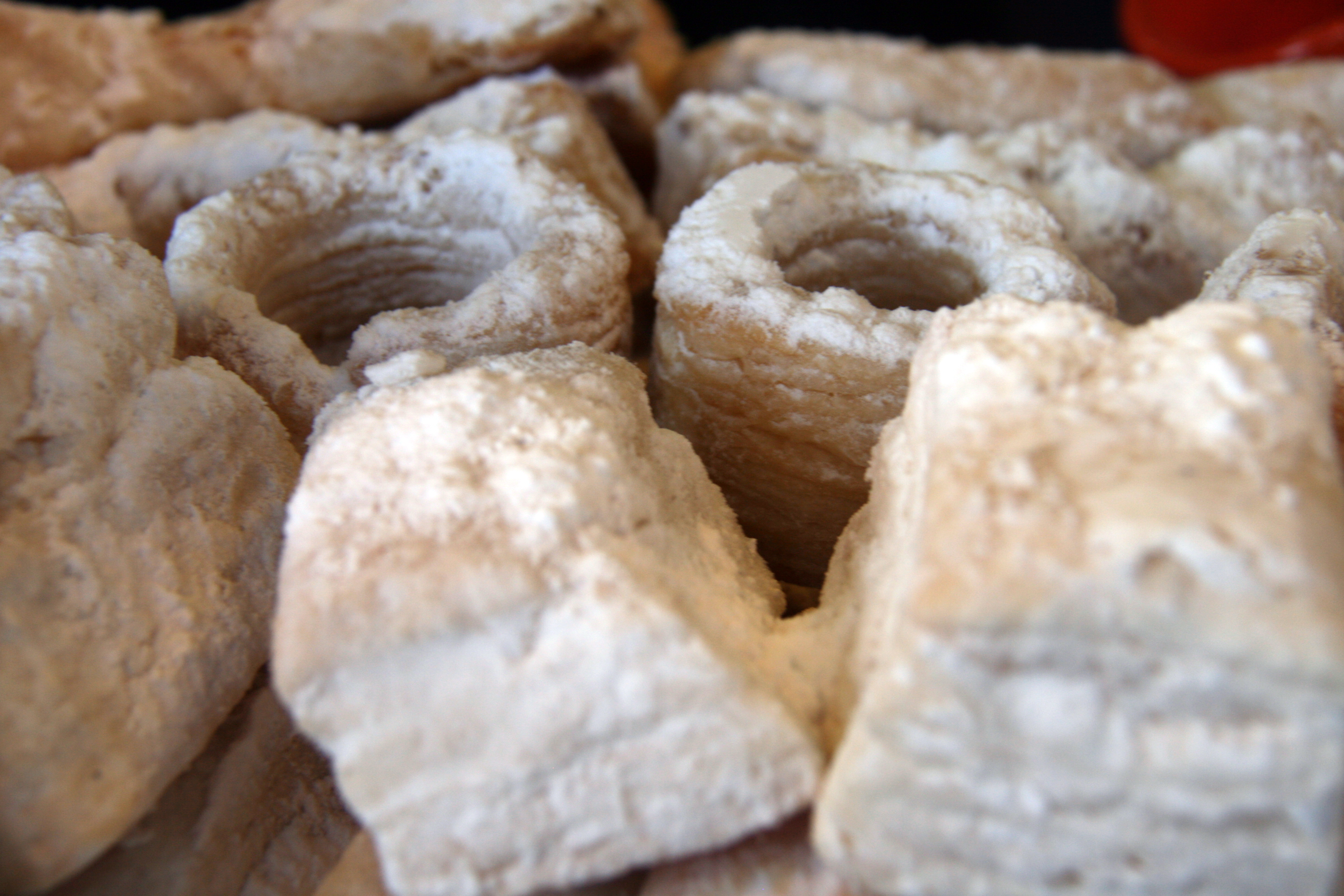
Hojaldre (puff pastry).

- Lechazo asado (roast lechazo, veal or lamb)
- Cochinillo asado (roast suckling pig)
- Cordero asado (roast lamb)
- Morcilla (blood sausage or black pudding)
- Tapa (appetizers or snacks)
- Bolla de chicharrones (pork rind cake)
- Gallo turresilano (Stewed cockerel)
- Mantecados de Portillo (mantecados of Portillo)
- Gallina en pepitoria (chicken in egg and almond sauce)
- Queso pata de mulo de Villalón de Campos (pata de mulo, cheese of Villalón de Campos)
- Ciegas de Iscar (Blind of Iscar)
- Pasta Castañuelas de Iscar (pasta castanets of Iscar)
- Rosquillas de Palo (bread donuts)
- Sopa de ajo (garlic soup)
- Lagunillas de Laguna de Duero (small lake of Laguna de Duero)
- Feos de Tordesillas (ugly of Tordesillas)
- Amarguillos (small bitter)
- Conejo (rabbit)
- Pichones estofados (stewed pigeon)
- Tortas de chicharrones (pork rind cake)
- Tortilla de chorizo (chorizo omelette)
- Morcilla de Valladolid (black pudding of Valladolid)
- Morcilla de Cigales (black pudding of Cigales)
- Piñones de Pedrajas de San Esteban (pine nuts of Pedrajas de San Esteban)
- Esparragos de Tudela de Duero (asparagus of Tudela de Duero)
- Borrachos y Pastas de vino de Peñafiel (Drunken and pastas with wine of Peñafiel)
- Sopa de chícharos (pea soup)
- Arroz con leche (rice pudding)
- Almendras Garrapiñadas de Villafrechos (garrapinyades almonds of Villafrechos)
- Pan de la provincia de Valladolid (bread of the province of Valladolid)
- Salchichas de Zaratán (sausages of Zaratán)
- Ajos de Portillo (garlic of Portillo)
- Endivias de Peñafiel (envy of Peñafiel)
- Ajo de Vallelado (garlic of Vallelado)
- Lechuga de Valladolid (lettuce of Valladolid)
- Vino de Cigales (wine of Cigales)
- Vino de Ribera de Duero (wine of Ribera de Duero)
- Vino de Rueda (wine of Rueda)
- Vino de Tierra de León (wine of Tierra de León)
- Vino of Toro (wine of Toro)

== See also ==
- Castilian-Leonese cuisine
- Spanish cuisine
- List of Spanish dishes
- Province of Valladolid
