= Montemayor de Pililla =

Montemayor de Pililla, Spain
- Flag Coat of arms

- Location within the Province of Valladolid
- Coordinates: 41.5099°N 4.45717°W
- Country: Spain
- Autonomous community: Castile and León
- Province: Valladolid
- Municipality: Montemayor de Pililla

Government
  - Alcalde: Francisco Javier Martín Sanz (2011) (IU)

Area
  - Total: 59.24 km^{2} (22.87 sq mi)
- Elevation: 869 m (2,851 ft)

Population (2025-01-01)
  - Total: 837
  - Density: 14.1/km^{2} (36.6/sq mi)
- Time zone: UTC+1 (CET)
  - Summer (DST): UTC+2 (CEST)
- Website: Official website

Montemayor de Pililla is a municipality located in the province of Valladolid, Castile and León, Spain. According to the 2004 census (INE), the municipality has a population of 1,036 inhabitants.

== Events ==
From 14 to 18 September, the Exultation of the Holy Cross is held with traditional festivities such as bull fights, music and dancing.

There is also a feastday on 22 July, as it is the day of Montemayor de Pililla's patron saint, Mary Magdalene.

== See also ==
- Cuisine of the province of Valladolid
