= Lechazo de Castilla y León =

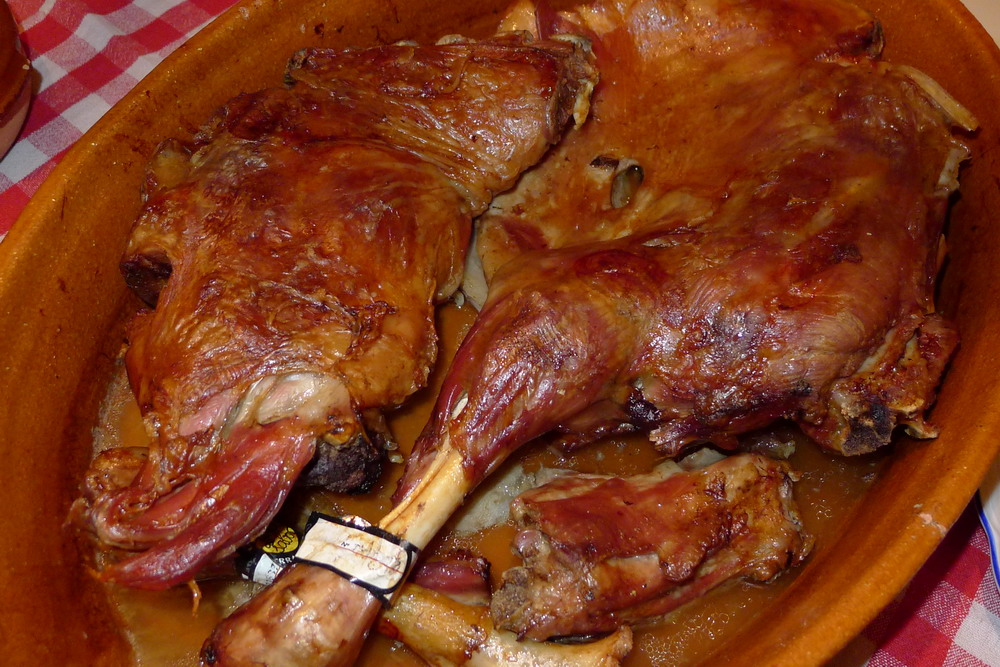
Lechazo asado (roast lamb), shown above, is a typical dish from the province of Valladolid and others castilian provinces.

Lechazo de Castilla y León is a protected-origin food product in the European Union consisting of milk-fed lamb meat, produced in Castile and León (Spain). The Geographical indication (GI) was authorized in 1997. The GI encompasses 483 farms from all of the grain-producing counties of Castilla y León, producing more than 167,000 lechazos per year. The Indicación Geográfica Protegida (I.G.P.) Council headquarters is located in Zamora, Spain.

The Spanish term lechazo refers to a young sheep that is still suckling. Per the I.G.P., lechazo de Castilla y León must be of the Churra, Castellana or Ojalada breeds, and the lambs must have been fed only their mothers' milk. Lechazo meat is a highly esteemed delicacy in the region. Roast lamb and lamb chop are prized traditional foods in Castile, and a widespread dish in the region's restaurants and taverns.

== Requirements at time of slaughter ==
- Live weight from 9 kg to 12 kg.
- Age of slaughter: up to 35 days

== See also ==
- List of lamb dishes
- Spanish cuisine
- Castilian-Leonese cuisine
- Cuisine of the province of Valladolid
