= Lechazo =

Spanish lamb dish

Lechazo asado
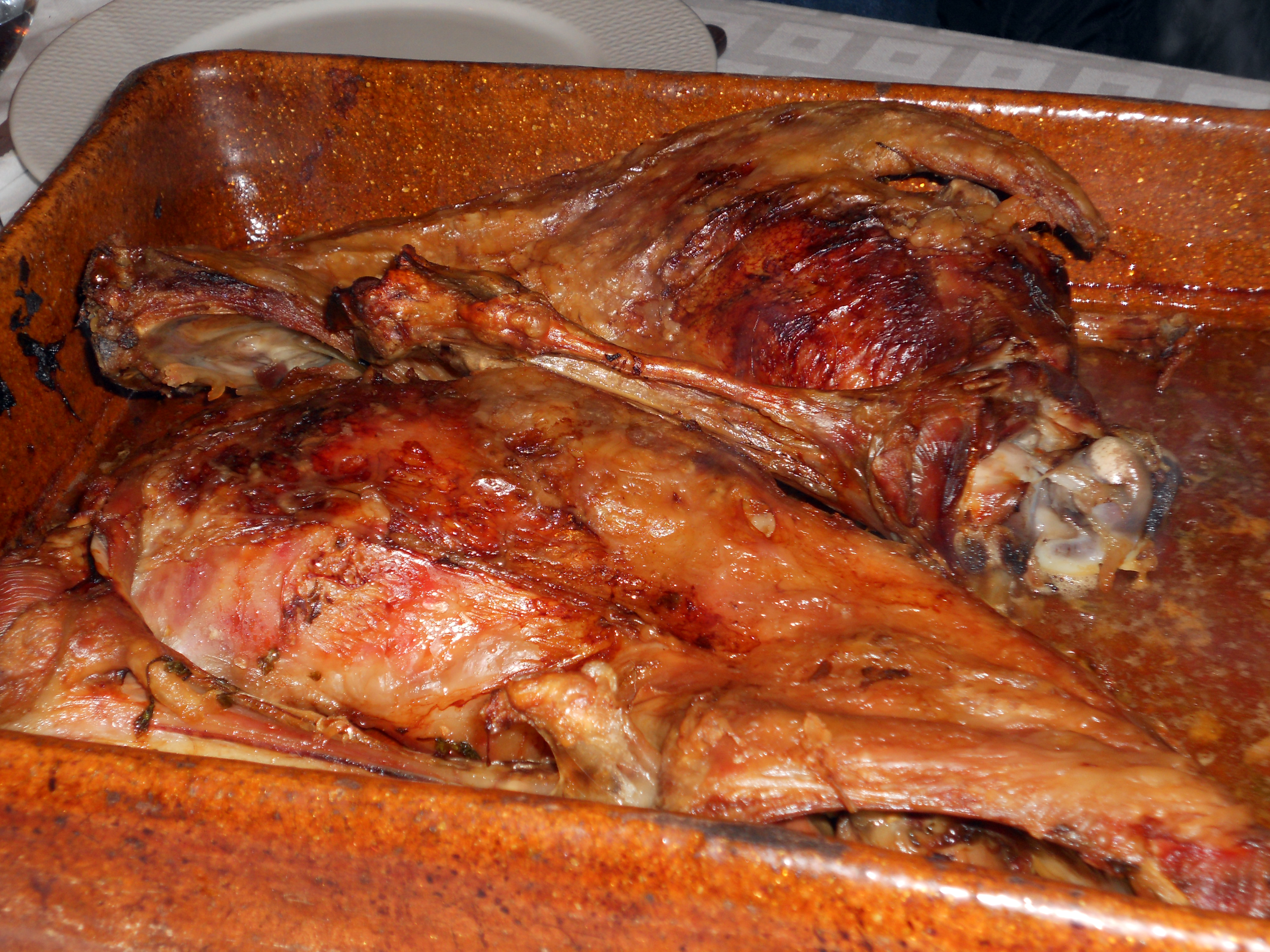
- Lechazo asado (roast lamb), shown above, is a typical dish from the province of Valladolid and others castilian provinces.
- Type: Asado (Roast)
- Course: Main course
- Place of origin: Spain
- Region or state: Castile and León
- Serving temperature: Hot
- Main ingredients: Lamb, water and salt
- Ingredients generally used: (optional): Olive oil, lard, garlic, lemon, vinegar, parsley or rosemary
- Similar dishes: Tostón asado

Lechazo is a Spanish dish made from "cordero lechal".

== Overview ==
The meat used is from unweaned lambs, and is similar to veal, or the meat of "cochinillo" (Spanish suckling pigs like tostón asado). The autonomous region of Castile and León has a distinctive version of lechazo referred to as "Lechazo de Castilla y Leon". It is one of the most important dishes of the cuisine of the province of Burgos. Aranda de Duero is known as the heart of the dish, with numerous restaurants that specialize in lechazo and feature "hornos de leña", or wooden stoves, in which the lamb is roasted.

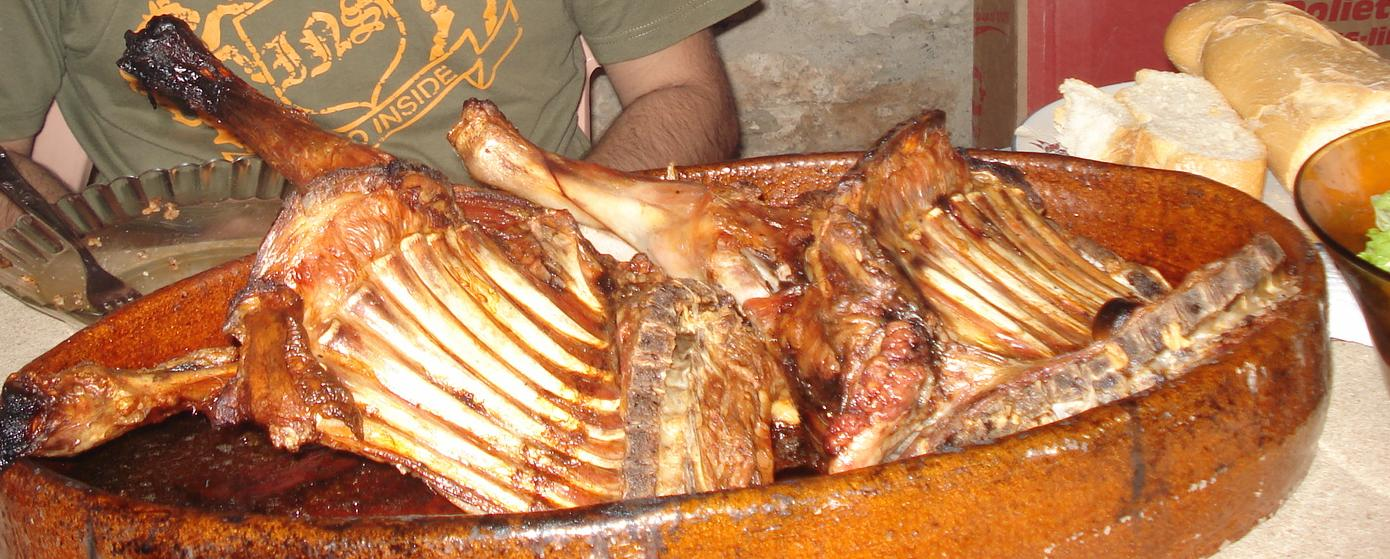
Roast lechazo.

The lamb used in lechal must derive all its nutrition from its mother's milk, and must be no more than 35 days old and weighing between 9 and 12 kilograms at the time of slaughter.

== See also ==
- List of lamb dishes
- Spanish cuisine
- Castilian-Leonese cuisine
- Cuisine of the province of Valladolid
