= Tierra de León (DO) =

Coordinates: 42°33′50″N 5°35′23″W

Tierra de Léon DOP
- Wine region
- Tierra de Léon DOP in the province of León in the region of Castile and León
- Official name: D.O. Tierra de Léon
- Type: Denominación de Origen Protegida (DOP)
- Year established: 2007
- Country: Spain
- Size of planted vineyards: 1,370 hectares (3,385 acres)
- Wine produced: 14,013 hectolitres
- Comments: Data for 2016 / 2017

Tierra de Léon is a Spanish Denominación de Origen Protegida (DOP) for wines located in the south of the province of León, in Castile and León, Spain, and covers an area of 3,317 km^{2} at an altitude of approximately 900 m above sea level. The area attained its D.O. status on 27 July 2007.

== History ==
Grape cultivation was probably introduced by the ancient Romans. The area benefited from being at the crossroads of two important routes: The Way of Saint James, the pilgrimage route running east to west from France to Santiago de Compostela, and the Ruta de la Plata, running north–south between the silver mines of the Cantabrian coast and the southern port of Cádiz.

Around the 10th century, the main economic activities of the region were cereal production and milling, along with grape growing and winemaking, which was practiced in the monasteries of different religious orders. Production increased steadily over the centuries until 1887 which is when the phylloxera virus destroyed most of the vineyards of the area. Production did not pick up again until the 1920s.

In 1985, a group of producers applied for DO status based on the promotion of the local autochthonous grape variety known as Prieto Picudo.

== Climate ==
The area has a continental climate (long, hot dry summers; cold winters). Temperatures in winter often fall below 0°C and there is frequent frosts and fog.

== Soils ==
Alluvial soil, good drainage, poor in organic matter.

== Varieties ==
- The recommended red grapes are: Prieto Picudo and Mencía; also authorized are Tempranillo and Garnacha.
- The recommended white grapes are: Verdejo, Albarín blanco, and Godello; also authorized are Malvasía and Palomino.

== See also ==
- Spanish wine
- Leonese cuisine
- Cuisine of the province of Valladolid
