= Prieto Picudo =

Variety of grape

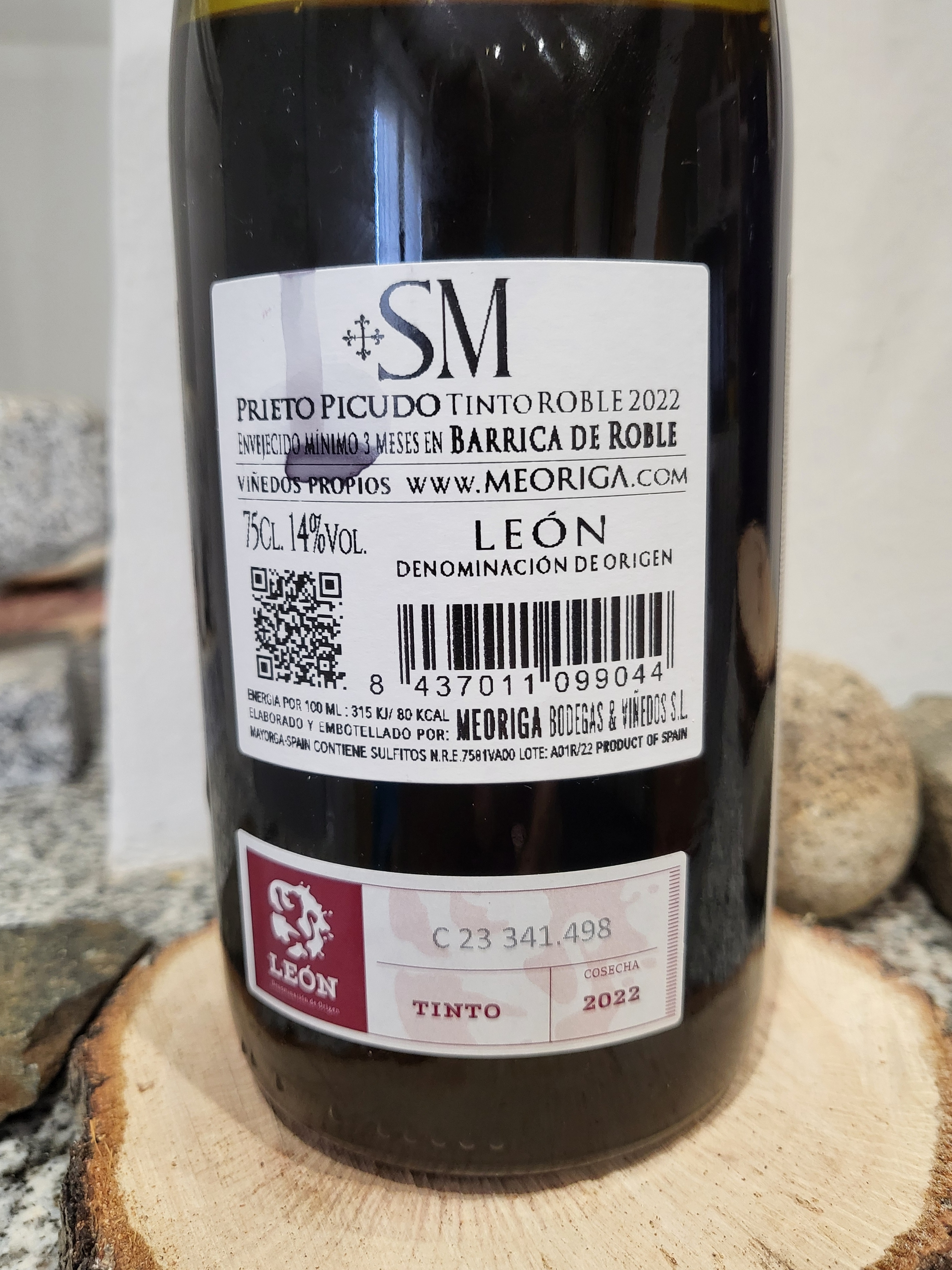
Prieto Picudo bottle from DO León

Prieto Picudo is one of the major wine grapes from the Spanish denomination of origin (DO) Tierra de León. It is a variety that delivers deeply colored red wines, with a clean acidity and high levels of sugar and tannin. This concentration gives Prieto Picudo wines a unique character and taste.

== Regions ==
DO Tierra de Leon includes Leonese municipalities and some vallisoletan. The main grapes of this DO are mencía, the prieto picudo and tempranillo. But without a doubt, the particularity of this land that the difference of the other wine regions in the world, is undoubtedly its variety native prieto picudo.

It is native to the area of Valdevimbre, Los Oteros and the banks of the river Cea, in León, and currently occupies an area of 3,000 hectares of vineyards. Today the area is part of the area of the according to the order APA/1819/2007. by which updates annex V, classification of the varieties of vine, of Royal Decree 1472 / 2000, of 4 August, which regulates the potential of wine production, the prieto picudo is recommended for the region of León and is licensed in Andalusia.

Some wineries that produce wine of prieto picudo in the region are: Leyenda del Páramo (Valdevimbre), la Cooperativa Vinícola Comarcal (Valdevimbre), Montegrande (Valdevimbre), Barcillo (Vadevimbre), Wineries Julio Crespo (Villalmán), Gondonzello (Gordoncillo) Gordonzello and Dominio DosTares (Pajares de los Oteros).

== Features ==
Prieto picudo grape is distinguished by its tight cluster and berries shaped oval and finished in tip, hence the name of the variety; prieto and Berry cluster beaked shaped. Their skin is bluish-black, and its flavor and aroma is sweet and intense.

It is usually planted in a trellis system to improve its production. It is often pruned in the thumb and rod method to ensure a good output.

== Vinos ==
Varietal wines from this grape have similar characteristics to the tempranillo. Gives rise to personal and very aromatic wines, although rather light with respect to the color.

With this grape occurs a "vino de aguja", made with the "madreo method". The process of this wine is to cause a slow second fermentation, which improves its quality, giving the typical spicy natural CO_{2} dissolved, without being sparkling. This second fermentation is achieved by adding must, grapes picked and whole of prieto picudo. The highest proportion of grape prieto picudo is required throughout the process.
