= Guiso =

Spanish food

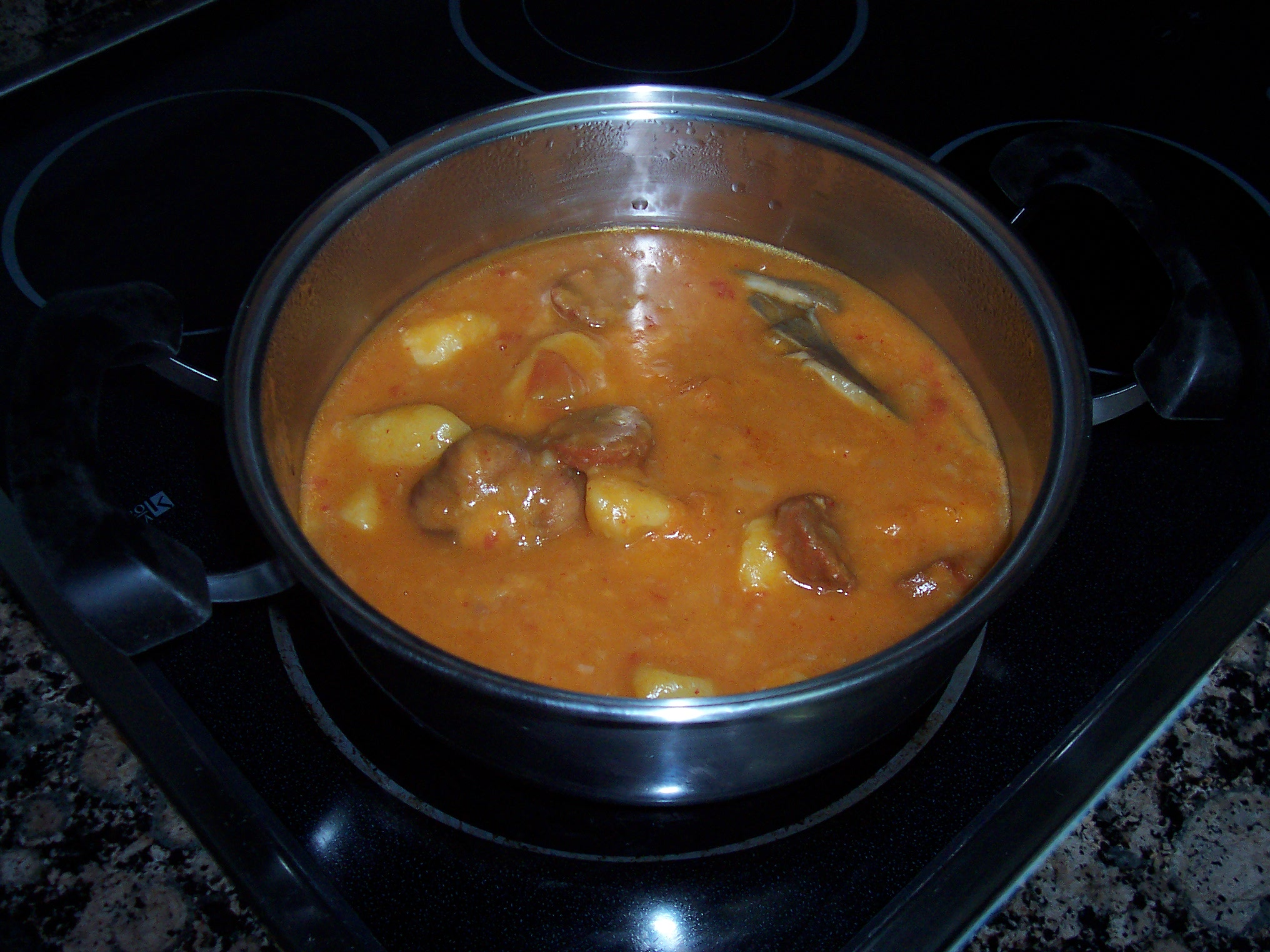
Gurupina, a traditional guiso from Granadan cuisine.

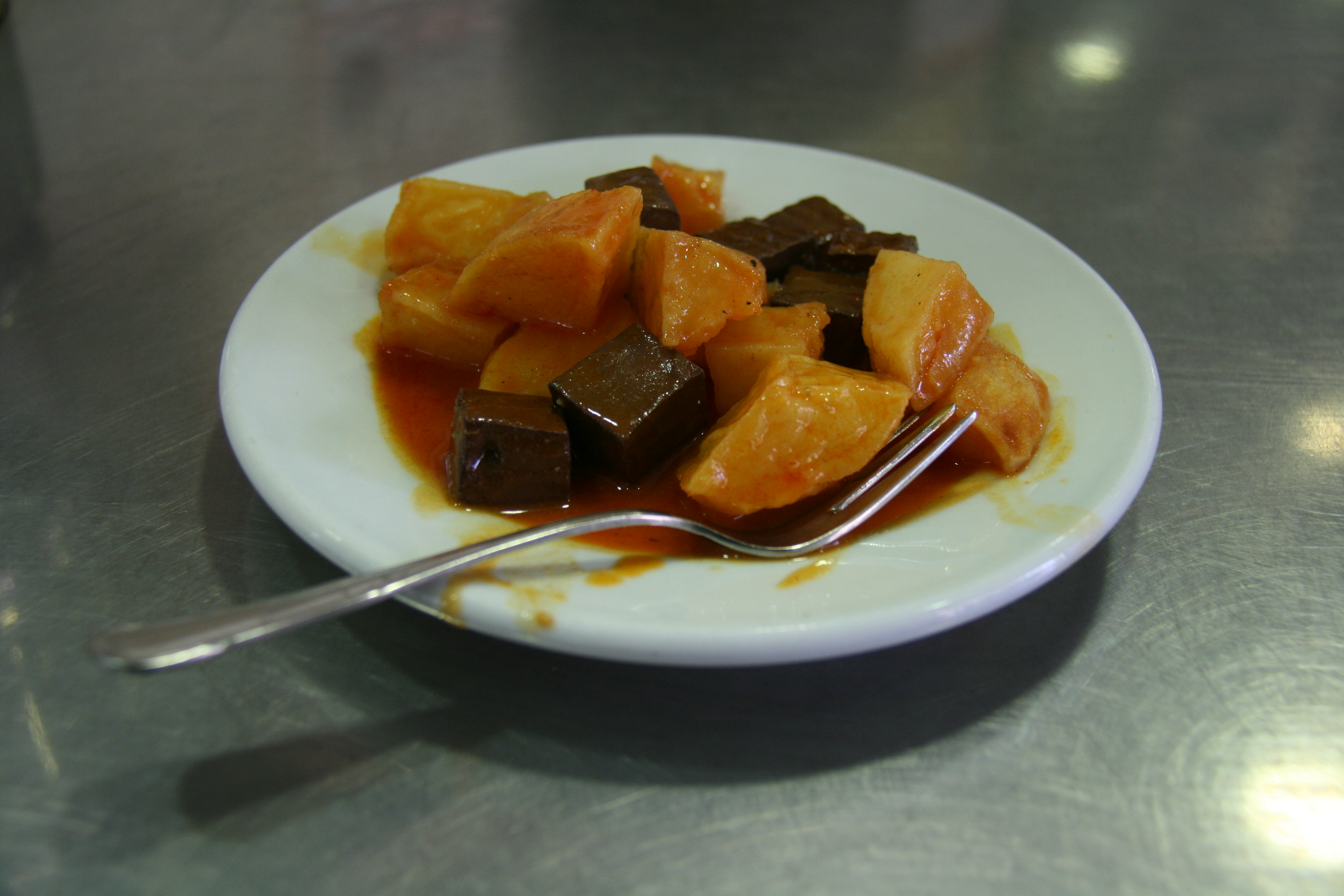
Guiso "potatoes with blood", served like a tapa.

Guiso is a Spanish meat dish prepared by roasting or frying combined with braising. It is typically a hot, mildly fatty food. Unlike stew, it allows the vapors to circulate during culinary process. In making guiso, a wide variety of ingredients may be used relative to region, season, availability, and taste.

== History ==
One of the first books written on Spanish cuisine, El Libro de los Guisados, written by Catalan chef Robert de Nola in 1525 CE, was based upon an older, Catalan book called Llibre de Coch, and lists various different recipes of the 15th century Mediterranean. Among these were the first recipes for guiso.

The word originated in the 18th century edition of the Diccionario de autoridades as:

"A dish that is composed and seasoned with broth, spices and other things that are roasted or fried."

Today, someone who makes guiso would be called a guisandero.

== Characteristics ==
Guiso's name gives the implication that it is made up of foods fried rehogado that are cooked in sauce. Guiso may have any number or variety of ingredients.

Examples of foods from around the globe prepared like guiso are frangollo, ragout, locro, tripe, ossobuco, and puchero.

=== Ingredients ===
More common guisos begin with a meat base. Said meat can be beef, pork, turkey, or fish, which may be chopped or put in brine on occasion. Like the foundation, guiso can have very diverse ingredients. Typically, guiso will also consist of cereals, starches, legumes, noodles, and vegetables. Although guiso is associated with sauce, wine may be in its broth as well.

== See also ==
- Culinary triangle
- Sancocho
