= Pata de mulo cheese =

Type of cheese

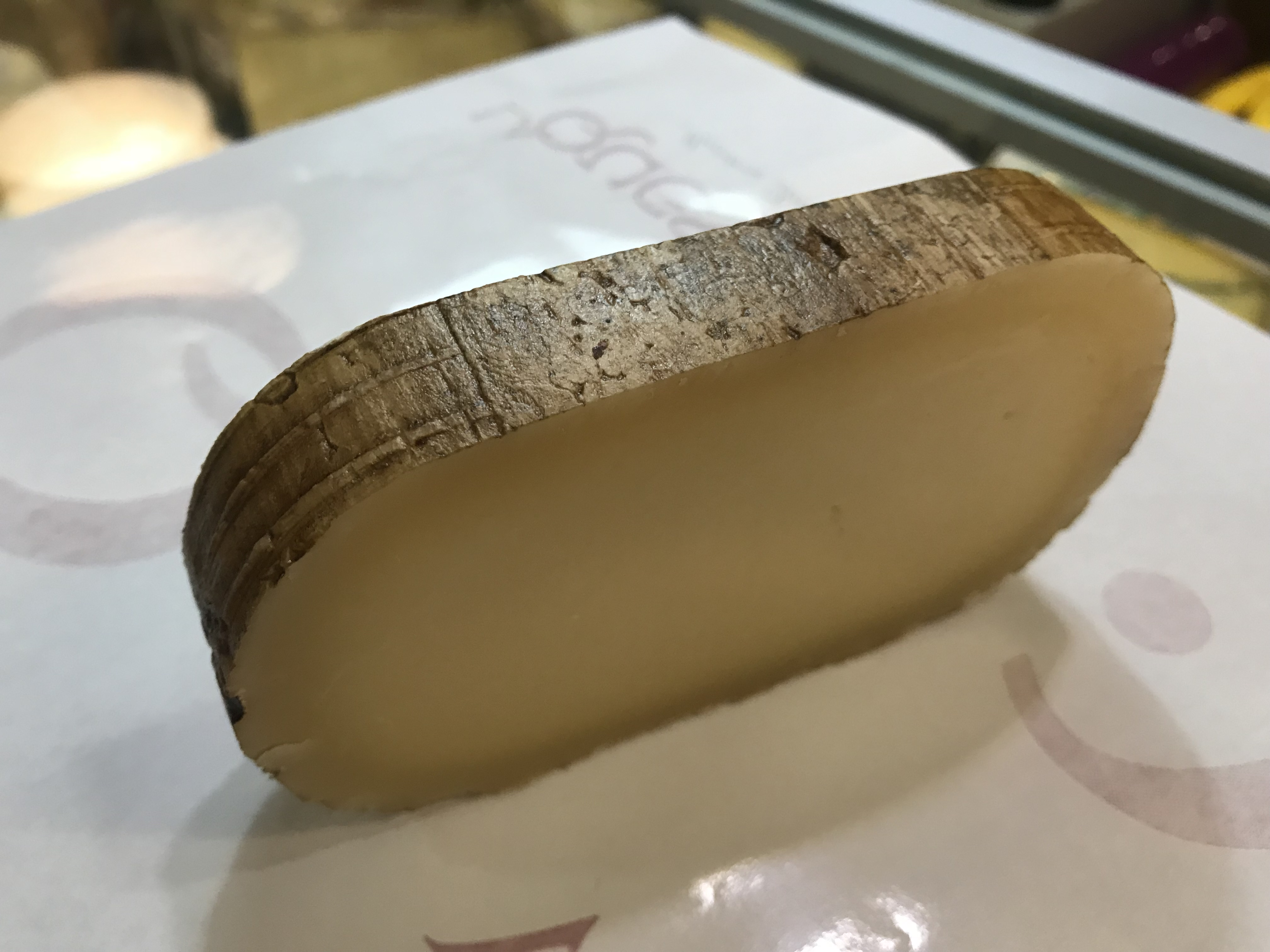
- Country of origin: Spain
- Region: Tierra de Campos
- Source of milk: Ewes
- Texture: Hard and grainy
- Dimensions: length 23 cm (9.1 in) width 13 cm (5.1 in) height 8 cm (3.1 in)
- Weight: 2 kg (4.4 lb)
- Aging time: 2-6 months
- Certification: pending

Pata de mulo cheese is a type of cheese made from ewe's milk in the Tierra de Campos comarca of Castilla y León, Spain. It originated as the aged version of the Villalón cheese, a fresh cheese made in Villalón de Campos, Valladolid. For its elongated shape it became known as pata de mulo, literally "mule's leg". This shape was achieved by moulding the cheese by hand in a cheesecloth. Several pata de mulo cheeses made by Los Payuelos have been awarded prizes at the World Cheese Awards, including Super Gold (curado, 2013) and Silver (semicurado, 2017).

It is a cheese of intense pressing and enzymatic coagulation. It is made with pasteurized sheep's milk, it is later submerged in brine and left to mature for 3 to 6 months. It can be described as compact paste and its interior blind or without eyes, practically friable or laminar. It is bone white in color that can become ivory white in the most cured. The bark is yellow in color with a hint of ochre. Its shape is tubular and on the palate it is reminiscent of cured sheep cheese, although it has a more salty and oily point. It can be paired with wines from the Ribera del Duero and also with dry whites.
