= Toro (DO) =

Spanish wine Denominación

Coordinates: 41°31′32″N 5°23′28″W

Toro DOP
- Wine region
- Toro DOP in the province of Zamora in the region of Castile and León
- Official name: D.O. Toro
- Year established: 1987
- Country: Spain
- Size of planted vineyards: 5,851 hectares (14,458 acres)
- No. of wineries: 63
- Wine produced: 33,513 hectolitres
- Comments: Data for 2016 / 2017

Toro is a Spanish Denominación de Origen Protegida (DOP) for wines in the province of Zamora, which is in the northwest of Castile and Léon (Spain). The area covered by the DOP is in the southeastern corner of Zamora province and includes the lands known as Tierra del Vino, Valle del Guareña and Tierra de Toro. It borders on the lands known as Tierra del Pan and Tierra de Campos. There are 8,000 ha under vines, of which 5,500 are registered with the DOP Regulatory Council (Consejo Regulador).

== History ==
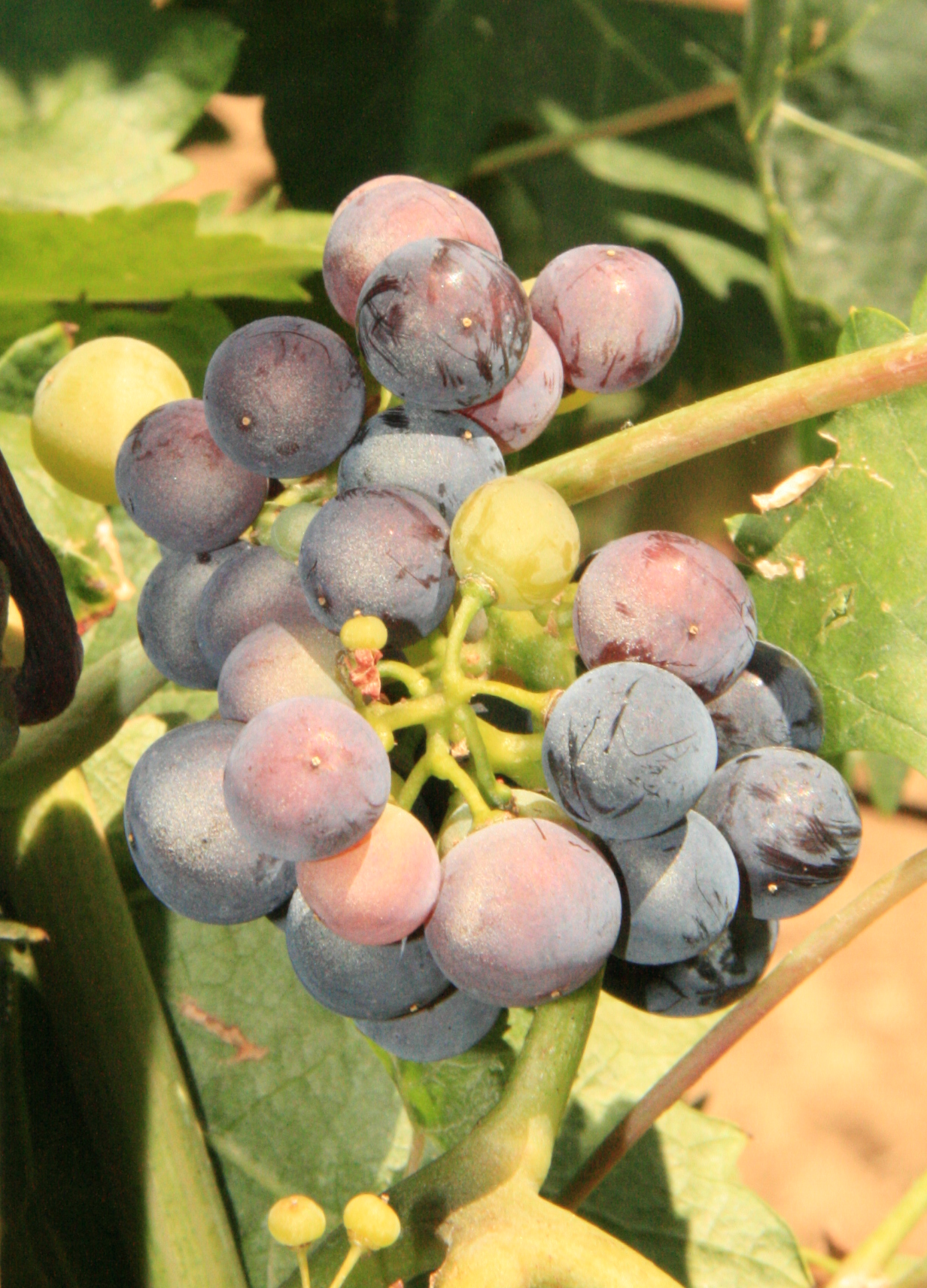
Grapes of Toro.

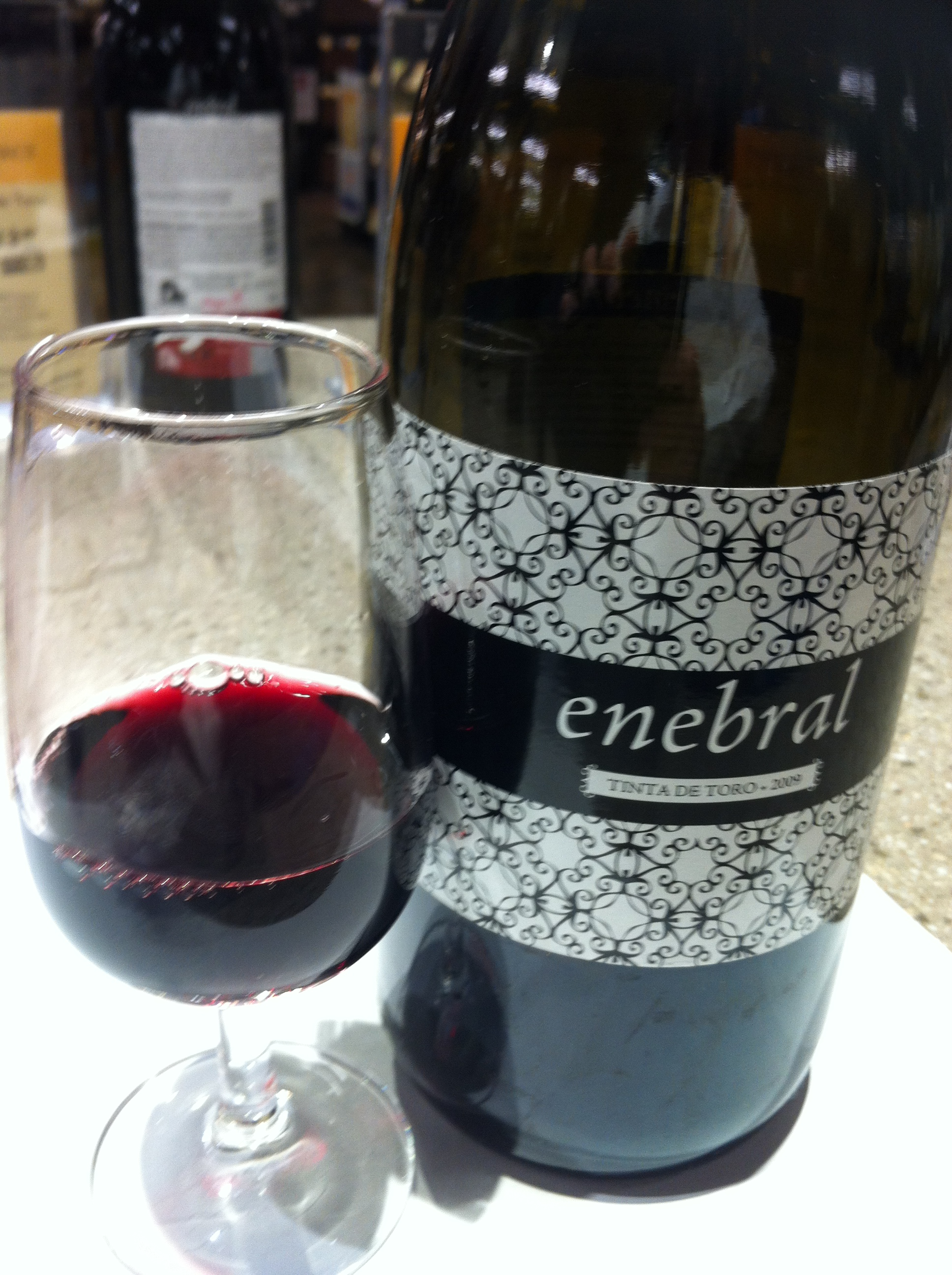
Red wine from Toro made from the Tinta de Toro grape (Tempranillo).

Wine has been made in Toro since the end of the 1st century BC, when the ancient Greeks taught the local Celtic tribes. In the Early Middle Ages, the wines from Toro were the first to be traded in the region of the River Duero.

King Alfonso IX granted lands to several religious orders with the understanding that they would plant vines, and many of the 40 churches that exist in the town of Toro today were built thanks to the wealth generated by the wine trade. The reputation of the wines from Toro grew and it began to be sold in other cities further afield such as Seville and Palencia. At this time the wine producers built underground wineries (bodegas) in order to obtain better quality wines and to have more effective temperature control.

At the end of the 19th century great quantities of wine were exported to France during the phylloxera crisis, which did not affect the local vines as they were protected by the sandy soil. For this reason, the vines of other regions of Spain were replaced by vines from Toro. For this reason, Toro still has a number of very old vineyards with pre-phylloxera Tinta de Toro, which in recent years have been used to source grapes for special cuvées.

The Toro DOP was created in 1987, and today is one of Spain's leading wine DOPs.

== Climate ==
The DOP has an extreme continental climate (long, hot summers, cold winters) with Atlantic influences. Temperatures vary greatly, ranging from -11°C in winter to 37°C in summer. Rainfall is light, around 350-400 mm per annum. Hours of sunlight received are about 2,600 per annum with a maximum of 3,000.

== Soil ==
The soil is formed by sediments of sand, clays and lime-bearing puddingstone, which produce a dark lime-bearing topsoil, with fine and coarse sands.

The vineyards are at heights of between 620 m and 750 m above sea level.

== Authorised grape varieties ==
- Red grapes: Tinta de Toro, Garnacha
- White grapes: Verdejo, Malvasía Castellana, Albillo Real, Moscatel de Grano Menudo

== Wines produced ==
- The red wines are predominantly made with 100% Tinta de Toro grapes. there are several types of reds:

- Young red: best drunk within the year of production
- Roble: a young red aged between three and six months (can contain some Garnacha)
- Crianza: aged for at least two years, of which at least six months in oak barrel
- Reserva: aged for at least three years, of which one year in oak barrel
- Gran Reserva: aged for at least five years, of which two years in oak barrel

- The rosé wines are made from 50% Tinta de Toro and 50% Garnacha
- The white wines are made from 100% Verdejo or 100% Malvasía

== See also ==
- Spanish wine
- Cuisine of the province of Valladolid
