= Candied almonds =

Sweet almond snack food

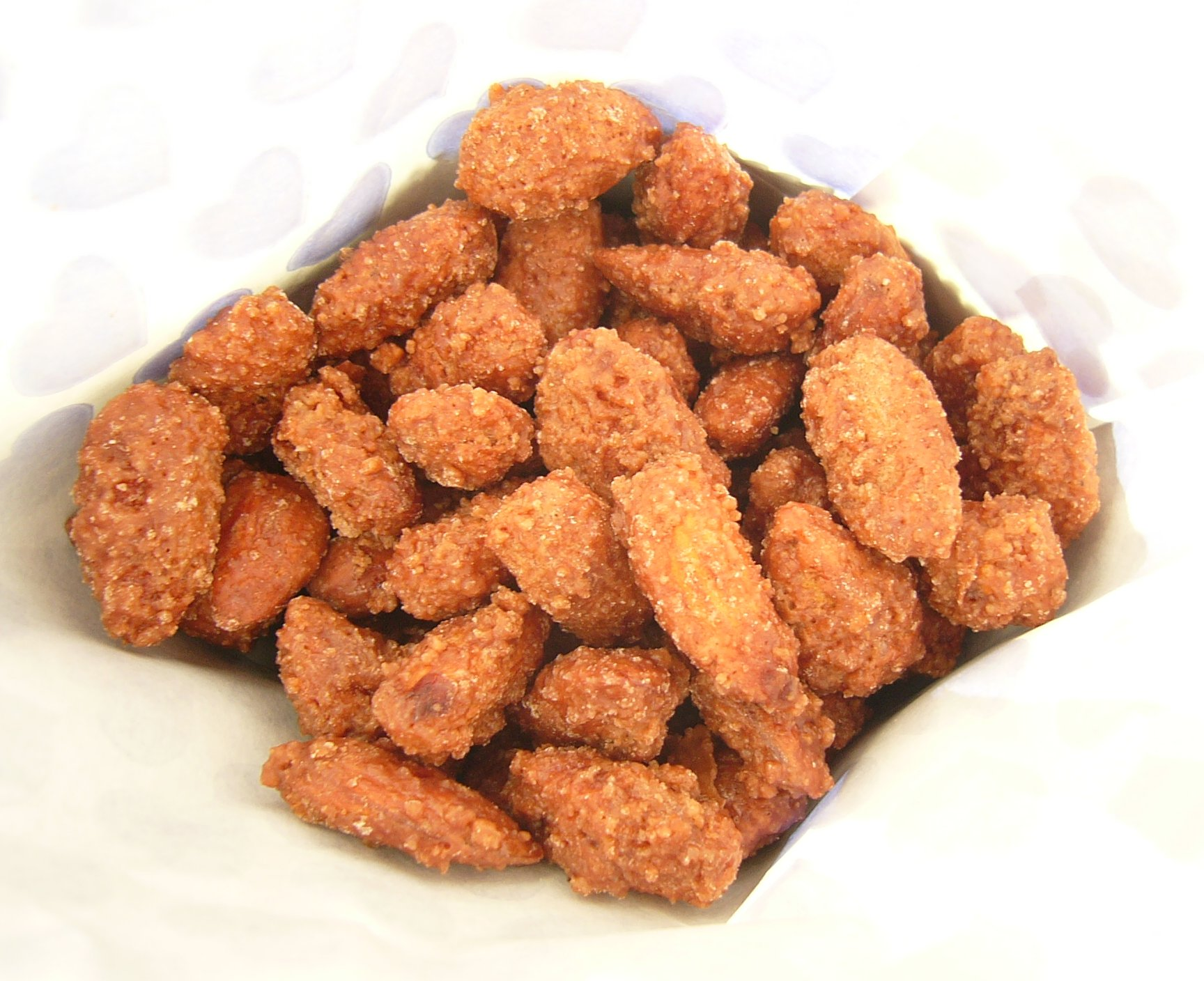
- Candied almonds
- Alternative names: Gebrannte Mandeln, Garrapiñadas, Addormentasuocere
- Place of origin: France
- Main ingredients: Almonds
- Ingredients generally used: Sugar
- Food energy (per 100 g serving): 304 kcal (1,270 kJ)
Nutritional value
(per 100 g serving)
- Protein: 7.6 g
- Fat: 18 g
- Carbohydrate: 32.7 g

Candied almonds or Praline are nuts (usually almonds) of French origin, that have been cooked in a special way, so they end up coated in browned, crunchy sugar. Candied almonds are cooked by heating brown sugar or white sugar, cinnamon and water in a pan then dipping the almonds in the sugar mixture.

== History ==
Candied almonds are said to have been invented in the 17th century by Clément Jaluzot, the head chef of Marshal du Plessis-Praslin (hence the name praline in French). The almonds are crushed and cooked with sugar, which caramelizes them.

There are different stories about the origin of this confection but it is believed to be named after Marshal du Plessis, Duke of Choiseul-Praslin. Clement Lassagne is another chef named as a possible creator.

== Other names ==
Candied almonds are a typical open air fair snack in several countries. In France, praline is the common name but sometimes they are simply called amandes grillées. In Spain they are called garrapiñadas. In Austria, Switzerland and Germany they are called Gebrannte Mandeln. They are also fairly common in Denmark, Norway and Sweden, being frequently sold at Christmas markets, where they are similarly known as brændte mandler, brente mandler and brända mandlar, respectively.

== See also ==
- Dragée
- List of almond dishes
