= Cigales =

- municipality
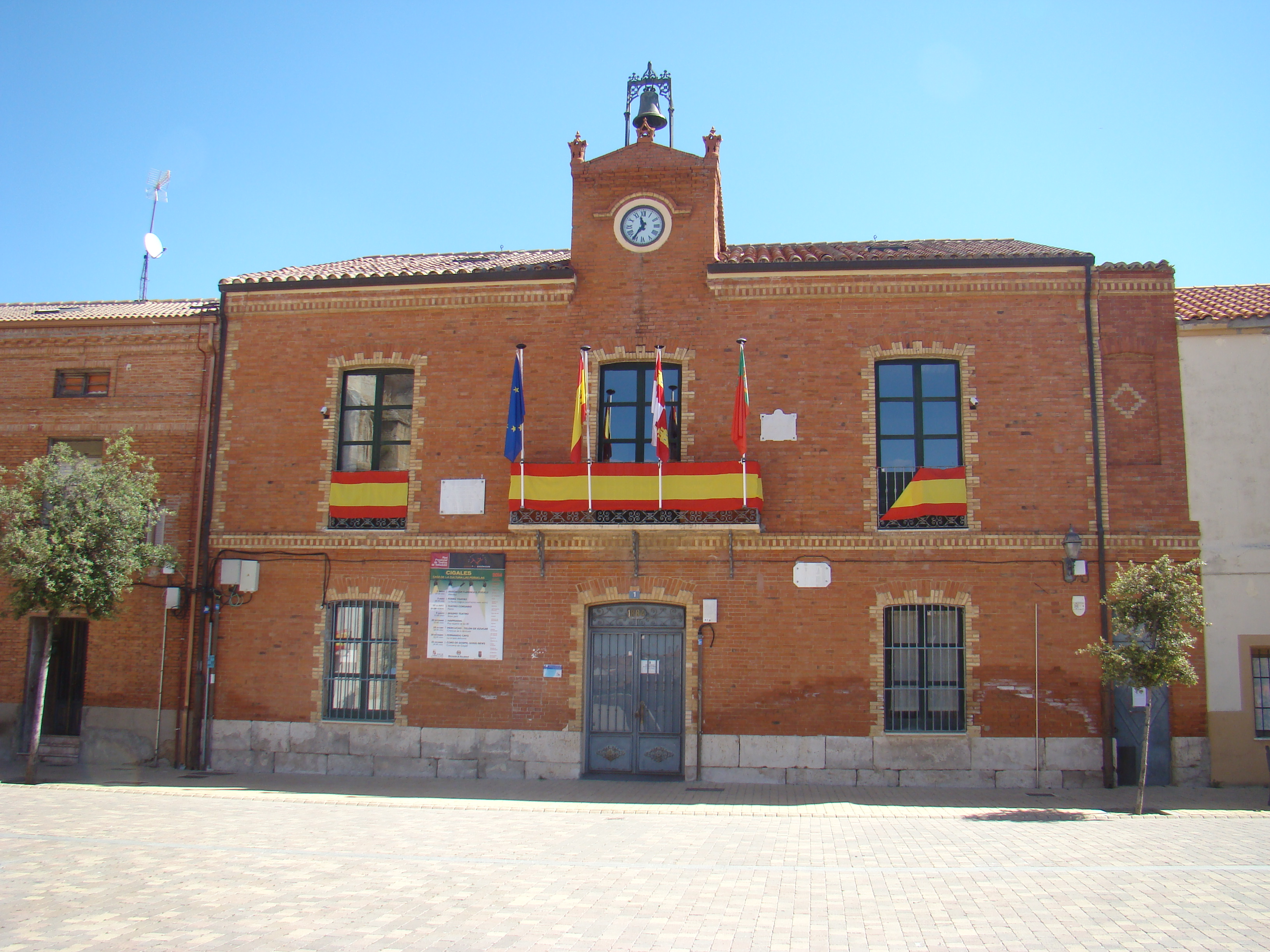
- Town hall

- Flag Coat of arms
- Interactive map of Cigales
- Country: Spain
- Province: Valladolid

Government
  - Mayor: Pilar Fernández Pastor (PSOE)

Area
  - Total: 60.97 km^{2} (23.54 sq mi)
- Elevation: 745 m (2,444 ft)

Population (2025-01-01)
  - Total: 5,454
  - Density: 89.45/km^{2} (231.7/sq mi)
- Time zone: UTC+0 (CET)
  - Summer (DST): UTC+1 (CEST (GMT +1))
- Postal code: 47270
- Area code: +34 (Spain) + 983
- Website: www.cigales.es

Cigales is a municipality in Province of Valladolid, Spain. As of 2016, it has a population of 5,032.
