= List of garden cities =

The localities in the following lists have been developed directly as garden cities or their development has been heavily influenced by the garden city movement. Detailed information is collected and provided by World Garden Cities, a knowledge platform created by Museum Het Schip in Amsterdam, the Netherlands.

== Africa ==
=== Morocco ===
- Ifrane

=== South Africa ===
- Edgemead, Milnerton
- Pinehurst, Durbanville
- Pinelands, Cape Town

Zimbabwe

. Harare

== Asia ==
=== Armenia ===
- Kentron District, Yerevan

=== Hong Kong ===
- Kowloon Tong, New Kowloon
- Sha Tin, the New Territories

=== Indonesia ===
- Menteng, Jakarta
- Kebayoran Baru, Jakarta
- North Bandung, West Java

=== Israel ===
- Tel Aviv

=== Japan ===
- Den-en-chōfu, Ōta, Tokyo

=== Pakistan ===
- Model Town, Lahore

=== Russia ===
- Akademgorodok, Novosibirsk, Novosibirsk Oblast

=== Singapore ===
- Singapore

=== Vietnam ===
- Da Lat

== Europe ==
=== Czech Republic ===
- Zlín

=== Finland ===
- Käpylä
- Kauniainen
- Tapiola

=== France ===
- Garden City, Suresnes, designed by Alexandre Maistrasse, Julien Quoniam, and Félix Dumail
- Garden City (in French), Stains, designed by Eugène Gonnot and Georges Albenque
- Garden City (in French), Pré-Saint-Gervais, designed by Félix Dumail

=== Germany ===
- Frohnau, Berlin
- Gartenstadt (in German), Mannheim
- Hellerau, Dresden

=== Hungary ===
- Wekerle estate, Budapest

=== Ireland ===
- Marino, Dublin

=== Italy ===
- Città Giardino Aniene (later Monte Sacro), Rome
- Garbatella, Rome

=== Latvia ===
- Mežaparks, Riga

=== Lithuania ===
- Žaliakalnis, Kaunas

=== Netherlands ===
- Tuindorp Vreewijk, Rotterdam
- Tuindorp 't Lansink, Hengelo
- Tuindorp Oostzaan, Amsterdam
- Tuindorp Watergraafsmeer, Amsterdam

=== Norway ===
- Ullevål Hageby

=== Poland ===
- Giszowiec, Katowice
- Jelonki, Warsaw
- Konstancin-Jeziorna
- Milanówek
- Młociny, Warsaw
- Podkowa Leśna
- Radom
- Sępolno, Wrocław
- Służew, Warsaw

=== Portugal ===
- Encarnação, Lisbon

=== Russia ===
- Zelenograd, Moscow

=== Slovakia ===
- Svit

=== Slovenia ===
- Velenje

=== Spain ===
- Covaresa, Valladolid

=== United Kingdom ===
==== England ====
- Bedford Park, London
- Bournville Village, Birmingham
- Brentham Garden Suburb, London
- Ebbsfleet Garden City, London
- Hampstead Garden Suburb, London
- Letchworth Garden City, Hertfordshire
- Manor, Sheffield, South Yorkshire
- Moor Pool, Birmingham
- Milton Keynes, Buckinghamshire
- Penkhull Garden Village, Stoke-on-Trent
- St Helier, London
- Telford, Shropshire
- The Garden Village, Kingston upon Hull, Yorkshire
- Welwyn Garden City, Hertfordshire
- Wythenshawe, Manchester

==== Scotland ====
- Glenrothes, Fife
- Rosyth, Fife

==== Wales ====
- Glyn Cory Garden Village (now Wyndham Park), Vale of Glamorgan
- Kinmel Bay, Conwy

== North America ==
=== Canada ===
- Grand Falls-Windsor, Newfoundland and Labrador (1905)
- Prince Rupert, British Columbia (1910)
- Town of Mount Royal, Quebec (1912)
- Gardenvale Neighbourhood, Sainte-Anne-de-Bellevue, Quebec, (ca. 1918)
- Kapuskasing, Ontario (1921)
- Corner Brook, Newfoundland and Labrador (1923)
- Cité-jardin du Tricentenaire (Tricentennial Garden-City), Montreal, Quebec (1940–1947),
- Kitimat, British Columbia (1951)

=== United States ===
- Augusta, Georgia (1900)
- Forest Hills, Queens, New York City, New York (start date 1908)
- Jackson Heights, New York City
- Forest Hills, Boston (1911)
- Park Circle, North Charleston, South Carolina (ca. 1912)
- Narbrook Park, Narberth, Pennsylvania (c. 1915)
- Fairview, Camden, New Jersey (1918)
- Mariemont, Ohio (1923)
- Sunnyside Gardens Historic District, Queens, New York City, New York (1920s)
- Radburn, New Jersey (1929)
- Three New Deal Greenbelt communities:
  - Greenbelt, Maryland (1935)
  - Greenhills, Ohio (1930s)
  - Greendale, Wisconsin (1936)
- Chatham Village, Pittsburgh, Pennsylvania (1930s)
- Wyvernwood Garden Apartments, Los Angeles, California (1939)
- Wilshire Village, Houston, Texas (1940, demolished 2009)
- Baldwin Hills Village, Los Angeles, California (1941)
- Epcot, Bay Lake, Florida (1960s)
- Village Homes, Davis, California (1960s)
- Reston, Virginia (1964)
- Paloma Del Sol, Temecula, California (1992)

== Oceania ==
=== Australia ===
- Haberfield, New South Wales, Sydney, New South Wales (1901)
- Daceyville (Dacey Garden Suburb), New South Wales, Sydney, New South Wales (1912)
- Rosebery, Sydney, New South Wales (1912)
- Colonel Light Gardens, Adelaide, South Australia (1915)
- Garden City, Victoria, in inner bayside Melbourne, Victoria (1926)
- Peter Lalor Housing Estate, Lalor, Victoria
- The Sunshine Estate, Sunshine, Victoria
- Canberra, the Australian Capital Territory (1913)
- Wundowie, Western Australia (1947)

=== New Zealand ===
- Christchurch, Canterbury

== South America ==
=== Argentina ===
- Ciudad Jardín Lomas del Palomar, Buenos Aires

=== Brazil ===
- Cianorte
- Goiânia
- Jardins, São Paulo
- Maringá

=== Chile ===
- Providencia
- Viña del Mar
