= Juan de Valladolid =

Castilian poet

Juan de Valladolid (English: John of Valladoid) (c. 1420–?), also known as Juan Poeta ("John the poet"), was a Castilian poet. Born Jewish, he converted to Christianity later in life. As a converso or a baptized Jew, he married a Christian woman named Jamila.

Born in Valladolid, Juan de Valladolid lived for some time at the courts in Naples and Milan, where he was an astrologer. On his way back to Spain, he was taken prisoner by pirates who took him to Fez. It was reported he had converted to Islam and also married a Moorish woman in Fez. He eventually traveled to Spain where he became known as a poet and made the acquaintance of Anton de Montero, where the two would exchange satirical poems.

With his conversion being widely known, contemporary poets refer to him invariably as "Juan el Judío" ("John the Jew") and he was held in high regard by Queen Isabella of Spain. His poems are found throughout various collections, including the Cancionero de Antón de Montoro.
