= Esgueva =

River in Spain

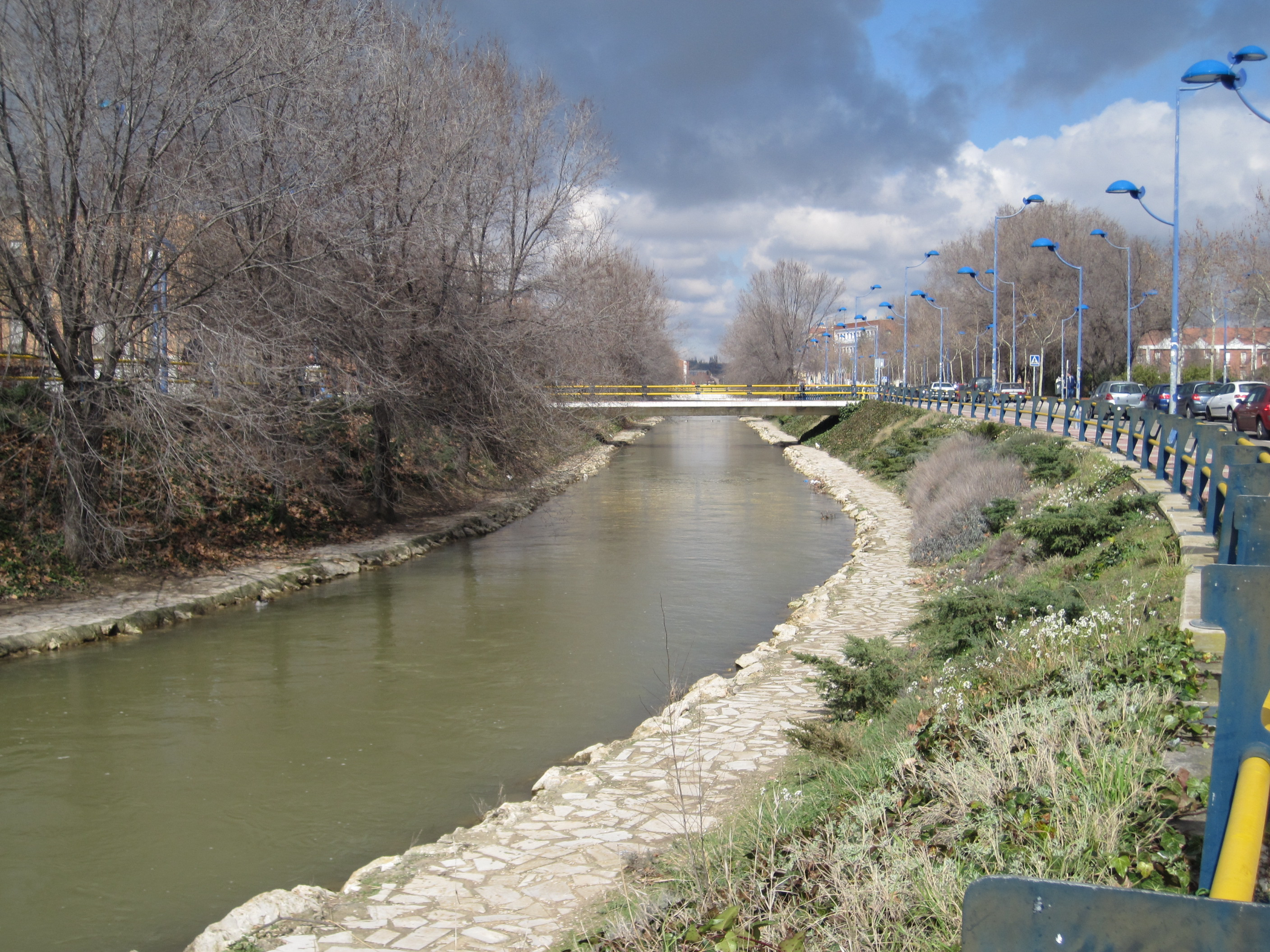
- Watershed of the Esgueva in Valladolid

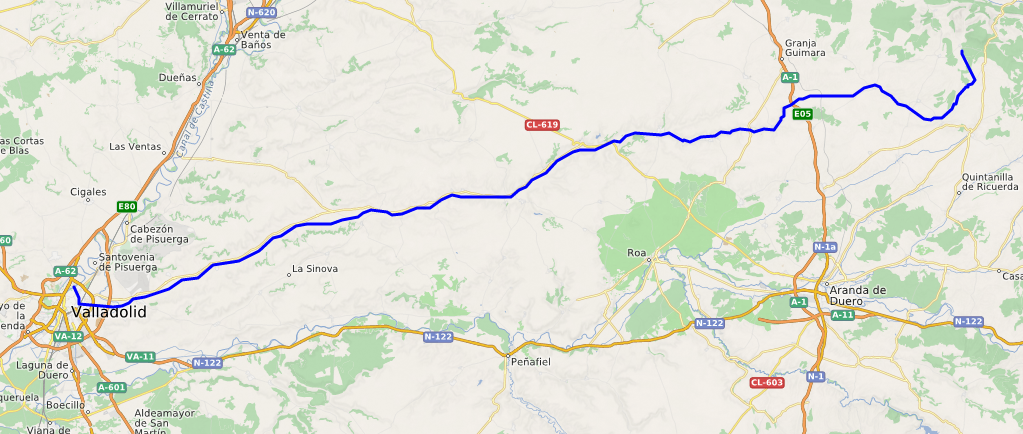
- Course of the Esgueva.

Location
- Country: Spain

Physical characteristics
- Source: Peña Cervera
  - location: Espinosa de Cervera, Sierra de la Demanda, Burgos Province, Castile and León, Spain
  - elevation: 1,021 m (3,350 ft)
- Mouth: Pisuerga
  - location: Valladolid, Campiña del Pisuerga, Valladolid Province, Castile and León, Spain
  - elevation: 692 m (2,270 ft)
- Length: 116 km (72 mi)

The Esgueva is one of the rivers of the Iberian Peninsula, flowing from its source near Peña Cervera in the province of Burgos. Its total length is 116 kilometres (72 mi).

It is a tributary of the Pisuerga River.
