= Valladolid =

- Municipality
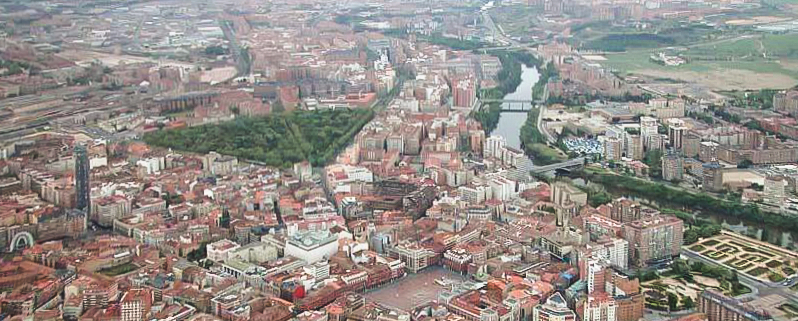
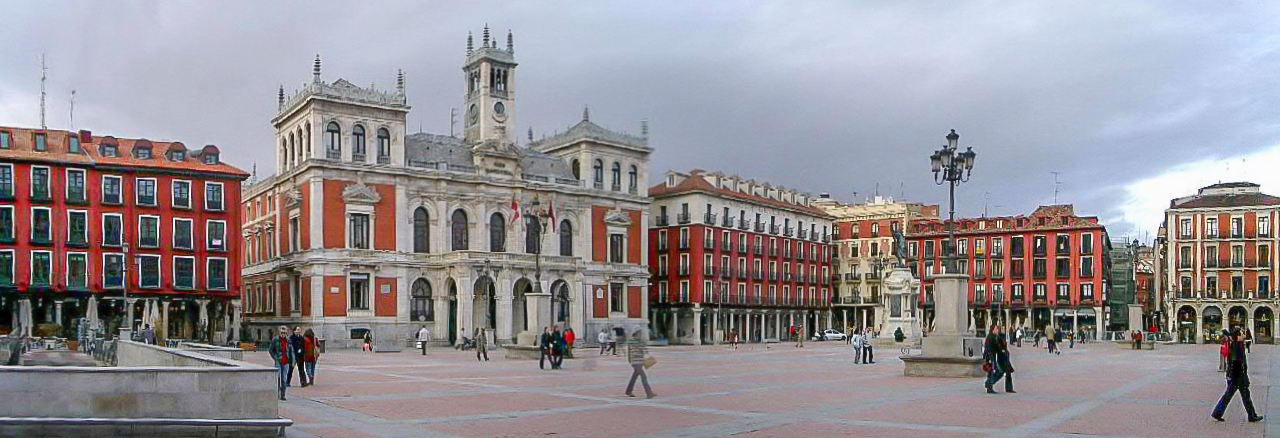
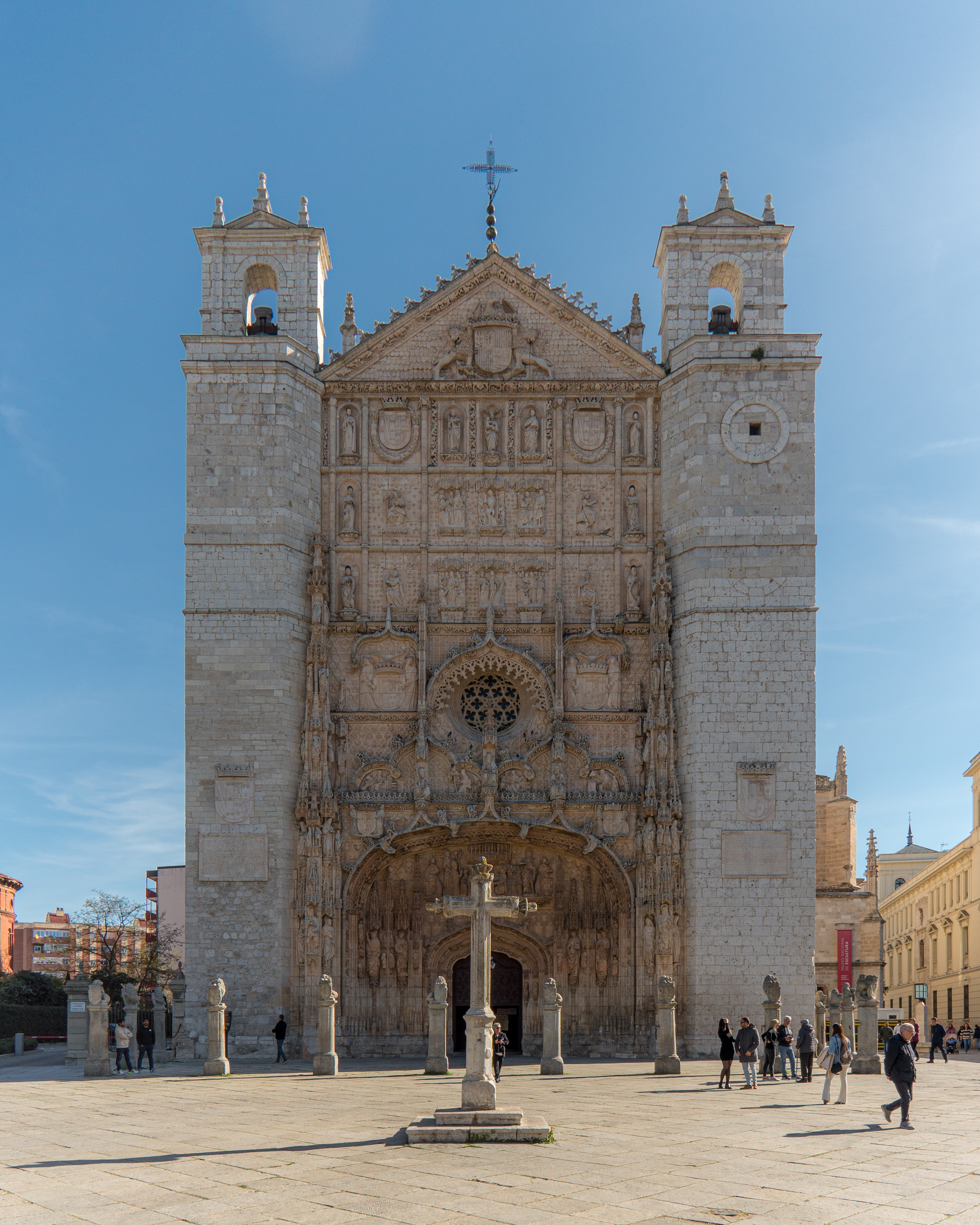
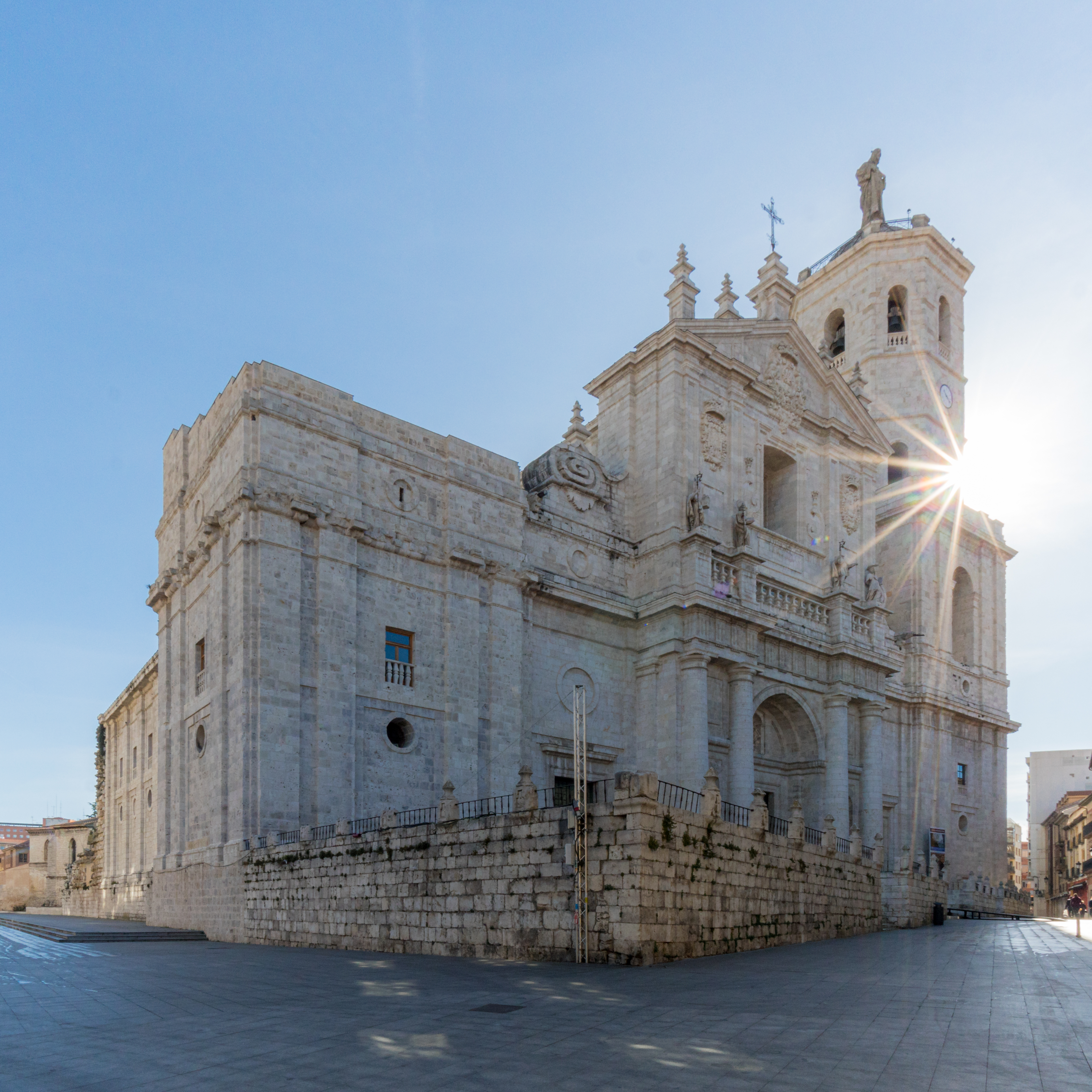
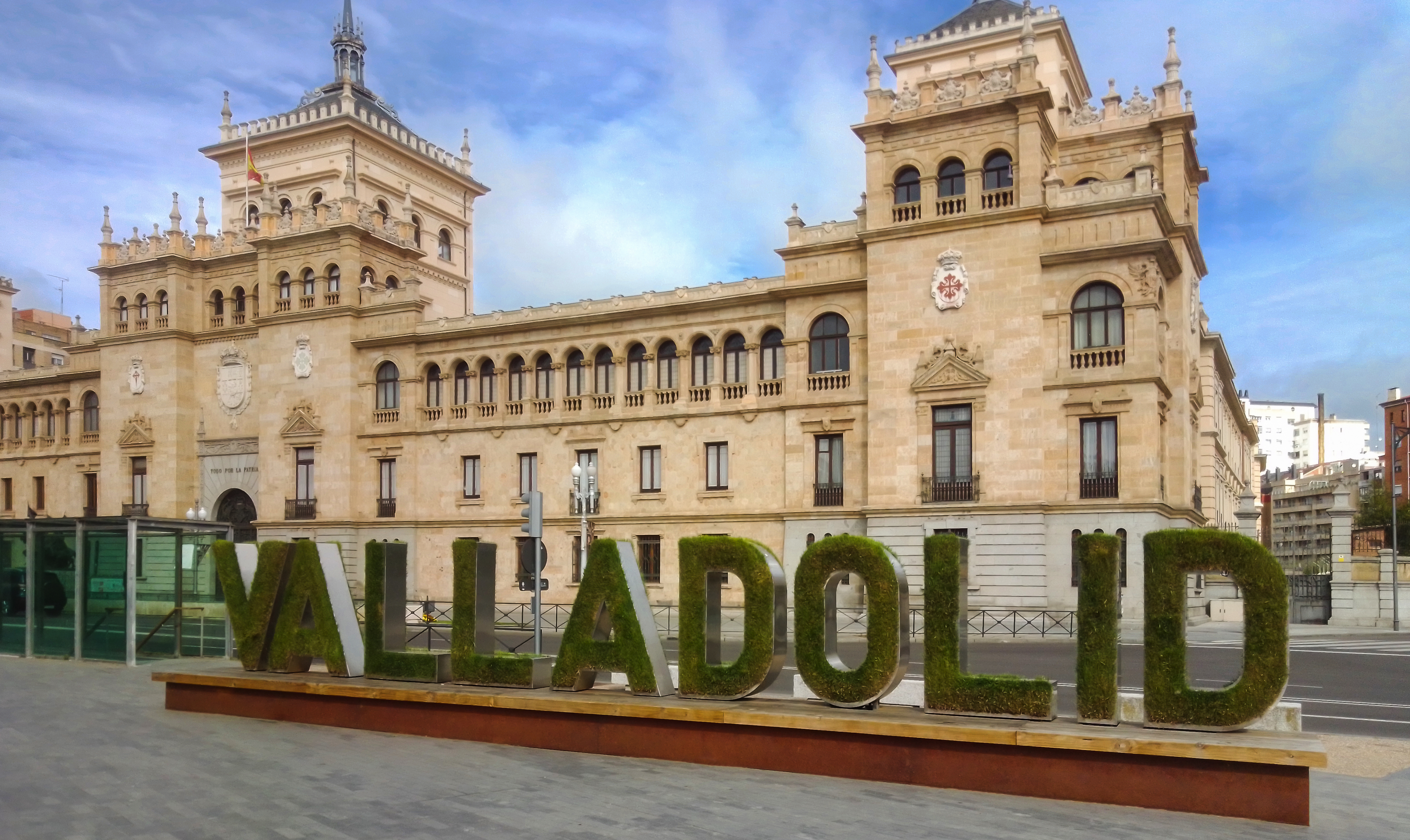
- Panoramic view The Town Hall in the Plaza Mayor Church of San Pablo Cathedral of the Assumption Landscaped sign installed in the Campo Grande; and the Academia de Caballería

- Flag Coat of arms
- Interactive map of Valladolid
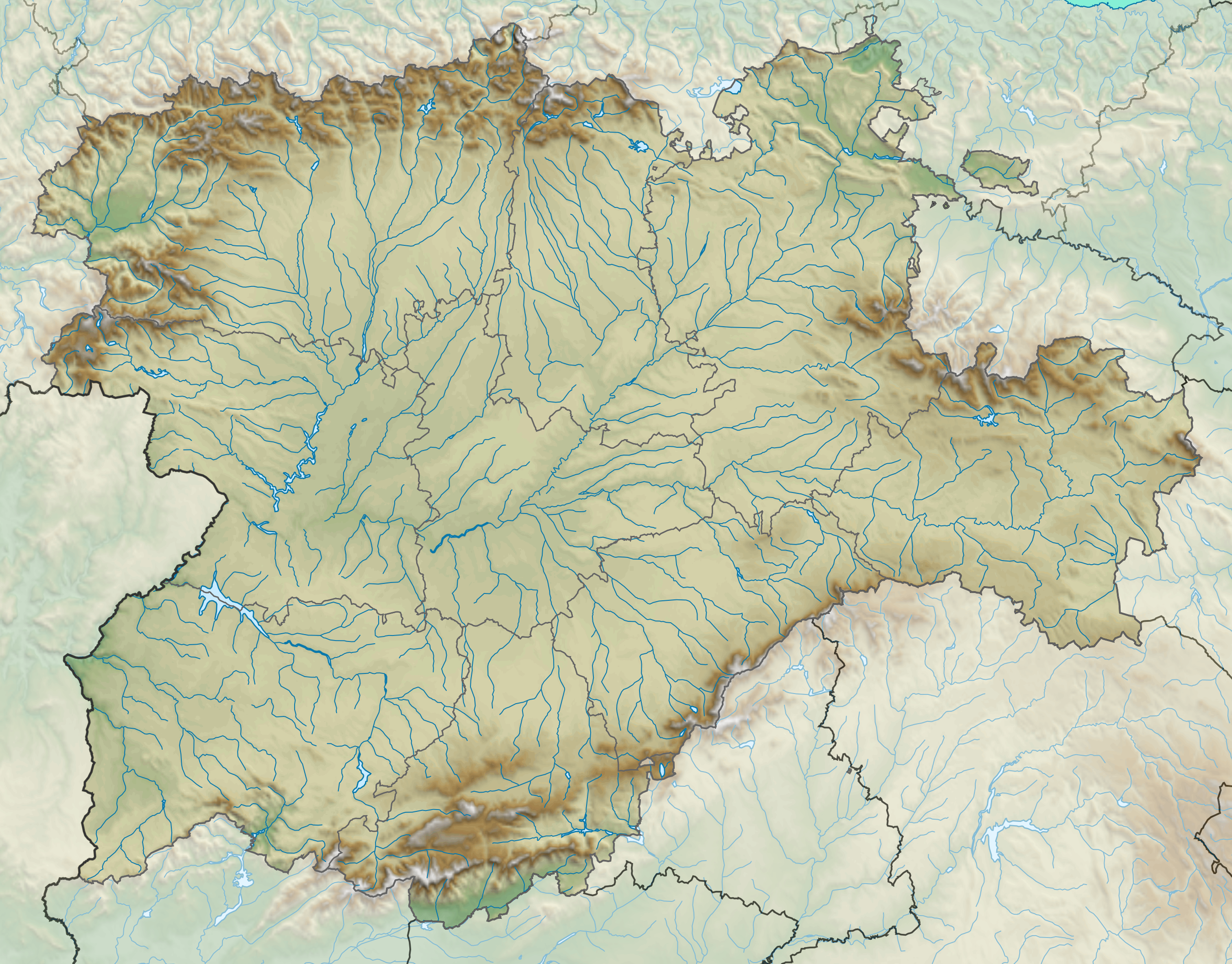
- Location within Castile and León Location within Spain
- Coordinates: 41°39′10″N 4°43′25″W
- Country: Spain
- Autonomous community: Castile and León
- Province: Valladolid
- Founded: 1072

Government
  - Type: Ayuntamiento
  - Body: Ayuntamiento de Valladolid
  - Mayor: Jesús Julio Carnero (2023)

Area
  - Total: 197.47 km^{2} (76.24 sq mi)
- Elevation: 698 m (2,290 ft)

Population (2024)
  - Total: 302 614
  - Density: 1.53/km^{2} (3.96/sq mi)
- Demonym(s): Vallisoletan; Vallisoletano, -a pucelano, -a (informal)
- Time zone: UTC+1 (CET)
  - Summer (DST): UTC+2 (CEST)
- Postal code: 47001–47016
- Dialing code: 983
- Website: www.valladolid.es

Valladolid (/ˌvælədəˈlɪd/ VAL-ə-də-LID; Spanish: [baʎaðoˈlið]), also popularly known as Pucela, is a city in Spain and the primary seat of government and de facto capital of the autonomous community of Castile and León. It is also the capital of the province of Valladolid. With a population of 299,816 as of 2024, it is the most populated municipality in the region. The city is located roughly in the centre of the northern half of the Iberian Peninsula's Meseta Central, at the confluence of the Pisuerga and Esgueva rivers 15 km (9.3 mi) before they join the Duero, surrounded by winegrowing areas.

The area was inhabited by the Vaccaei in ancient times. The current settlement was purportedly founded after 1072, growing in prominence within the context of the Crown of Castile, being endowed with fairs and different institutions such as a collegiate church, University (1241), Royal Court and Chancellery and a royal mint. It was partially destroyed by a 1561 fire. Valladolid briefly served as the capital of Hispanic Monarchy between 1601 and 1606. Local treasury cratered with the onset of the Castilian crisis of the 17th century. Commercial dynamism in the 19th century was boosted by the creation of the Canal of Castile positioning Valladolid as the largest wheat market in the region, and the overall improvement in communications. Industrialisation followed suit, coalescing with the consolidation of an automotive industry in the mid 20th century.

Among the events that are held each year in the city are the famous Holy Week, the World Jigsaw Puzzle Championships, and the Valladolid International Film Festival (Seminci). In 2019, Valladolid was recognised as a City of Film as part of UNESCO's Creative Cities Network. Together with another 15 surrounding municipalities, it belongs to an urban community of around 0.4 million inhabitants.

== Name ==
There is no direct evidence for the origin of the modern name of Valladolid, which is subject to much folk etymology.

It is mentioned as Valledolit in the Primera Crónica General; earlier documented variants include Valledolidi, Valleolide (1092) and Valleolit, Valleoleti, Valleoliti (1095).

One widely held etymological theory suggests that the modern name Valladolid derives from the Celtiberian language expression Vallis Tolitum, meaning "valley of waters", referring to the confluence of rivers in the area.

Another theory suggests that the name derives from the Arabic expression (Arabic: بلد الوليد, Balad al-Walid), which is the Arabic exonym currently used and means 'city of al-Walid', referring to Al-Walid I.

Yet a third claims that it derives from Vallis Olivetum, meaning 'valley of the olives'; however, no olive trees are found in that terrain. Instead, innumerable pine trees abound in the south part of the city. The gastronomy reflects the importance of the piñón (pine nut) as a local product, rather than olives.

In texts from the Middle Ages the town is called Vallisoletum, meaning 'sunny valley', and inhabitants are still called today Vallisoletano (male) and Vallisoletana (female).

The city is also popularly called Pucela, a nickname whose origin is not clear, but may refer to knights in the service of Joan of Arc, known as La Pucelle. Another theory is that Pucela comes from the fact that Pozzolana cement was sold there, the only city in Spain that sold it.

== History ==
=== Precedents ===

The Vaccaei were a Celtic tribe, the first people documented as a stable presence on the sector of the middle valley of the River Duero.

Remains of Celtiberian and of a Roman camp have been excavated near the city. The nucleus of the city was originally located in the area of the current San Miguel y el Rosarillo square and was surrounded by a palisade. Proof of the existence of three ancient lines of walls have been found.

After the Muslim invasion in Spain in 711, the Christian kings moved the population of the Douro basin into more easily defended areas and deliberately created a no man's land as a buffer zone against Muslim encroachment from the south. The area was reconquered by the Christian king Alfonso I of Asturias who reigned in 739–757, but because the area was close to the frontier, it had a small population until after the Christians had secured the entire Douro basin in the battle of Simancas, in 939.

=== Repopulation and growth ===
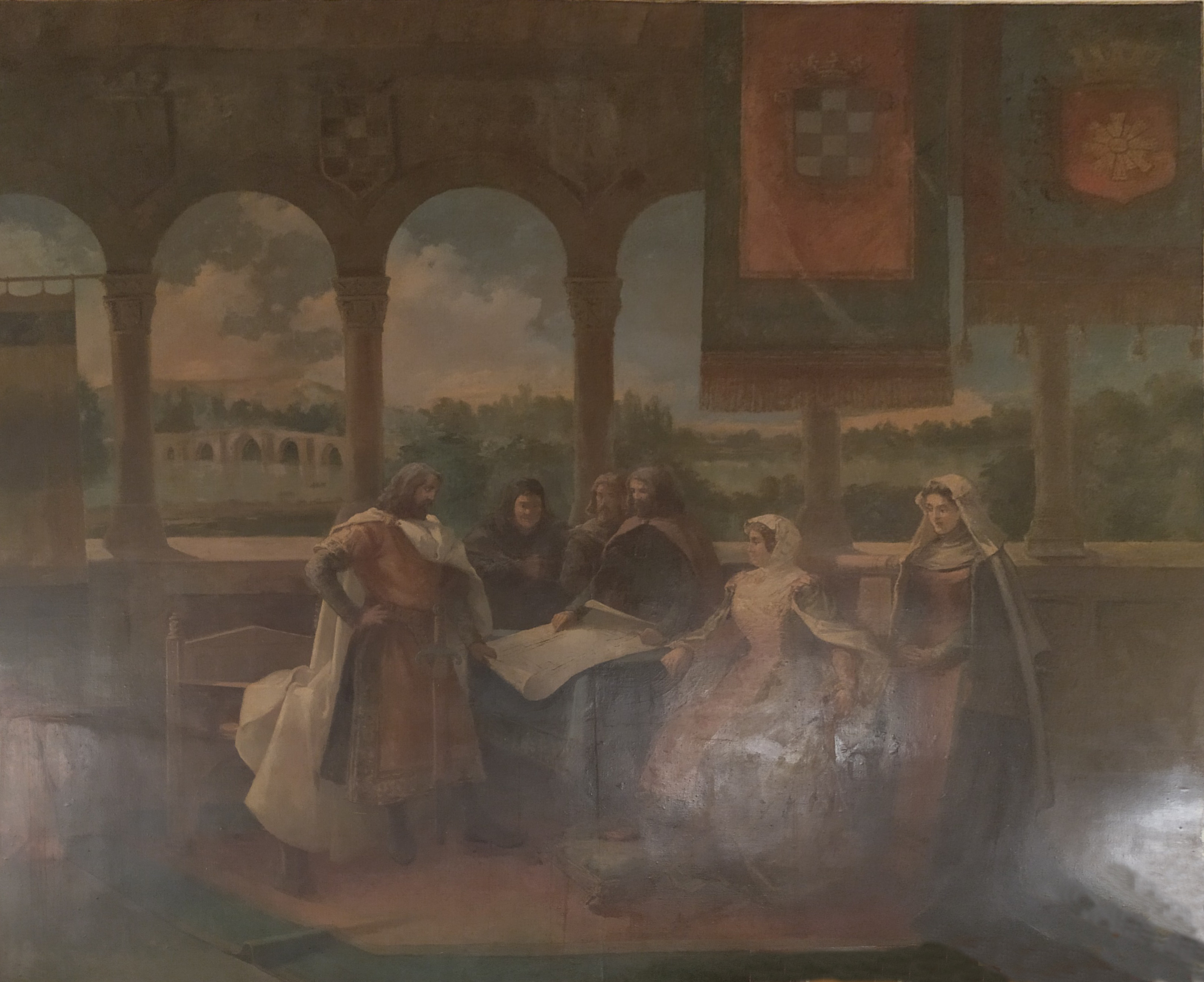
Historicist early 20th-century mural painting by Eugenio Oliva, depicting a meeting of Ansúrez, Eylo and other people in Valladolid

In 1072 Alfonso VI of León and Castile gave the Lordship of Valladolid to Count Pedro Ansúrez. Entrusted with the repopulation of the area, Ansúrez led the foundation of Valladolid along with his wife Eylo Alfónsez. By 1084 the project for the foundation of the settlement was already underway. Ansúrez built a palace (now lost) and La Antigua church. Eylo founded three hospitals and the Churches of San Sebastián and San Nicolás. Both co-founded the church of Santa María. Valladolid was repopulated by people from the lands of Carrión and Saldaña.

In the 12th and 13th centuries, Valladolid grew rapidly, favoured by the commercial privileges granted by the kings Alfonso VIII and Alfonso X.

=== Early modern period ===
In 1469, Queen Isabella I of Castile and King Ferdinand II of Aragon were married in the city; by the 15th century Valladolid was the residence of the kings of Castile. In 1506, Christopher Columbus died in Valladolid "still convinced that he had reached the Indies" in a house that is now a museum dedicated to him.

From 1554 to 1559, Joanna of Austria, sister of Philip II, served as regent, establishing herself in Valladolid, with the latter becoming the political center of the Hispanic Monarchy by that time. She favoured the Ebolist Party, one of the two leading factions of the Court of Philip II, in competition with the albistas. The Reformation took hold in some parts of the city where Protestant circles appeared presumably around the leading figure of Augustino de Cazalla, an adviser of Joanna. Ensuing autos de fe against the Protestant sects took place in 1559 in Valladolid. A catastrophic fire in 1561 destroyed a portion of the city.

During 1550–1551 the town held the first moral debate in European history to discuss the rights and treatment of the indigenous people by conquerors.

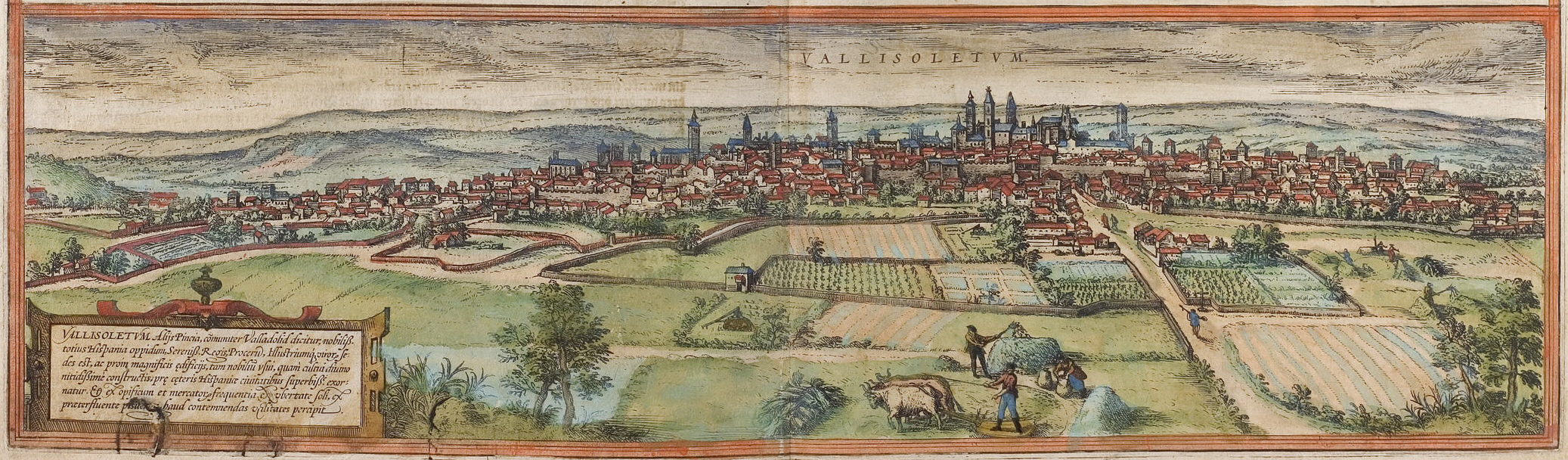
Vallisoletum, 1574, by Braun and Hogenberg

Valladolid was granted the status of city in 1596, also becoming a bishopric.

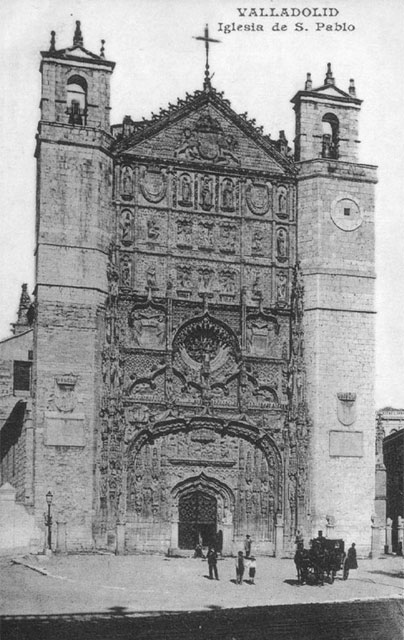
Old postcard of the gothic Church of San Pablo, c. 1900

In the midst of the reign of Philip III, Valladolid briefly served as the capital of the Hispanic Monarchy between 1601 and 1606 under the auspice of the Duke of Lerma, valido of Philip III. Lerma and his network had bought plots in Valladolid before in order to sell those to the Crown. Promoted by Lerma, the decision on moving the capital from Madrid to Valladolid has been portrayed as case of a (double) real estate speculative scheme, as Lerma had bought housing in Madrid as the prices plummeted when the capital was moved from the city. After a plague in Valladolid, Lerma suggested the King to go back to Madrid, earning a hefty profit when the royal court returned and prices went up again.

The city was again damaged by a flood of the rivers Pisuerga and Esgueva.

=== Contemporary history ===
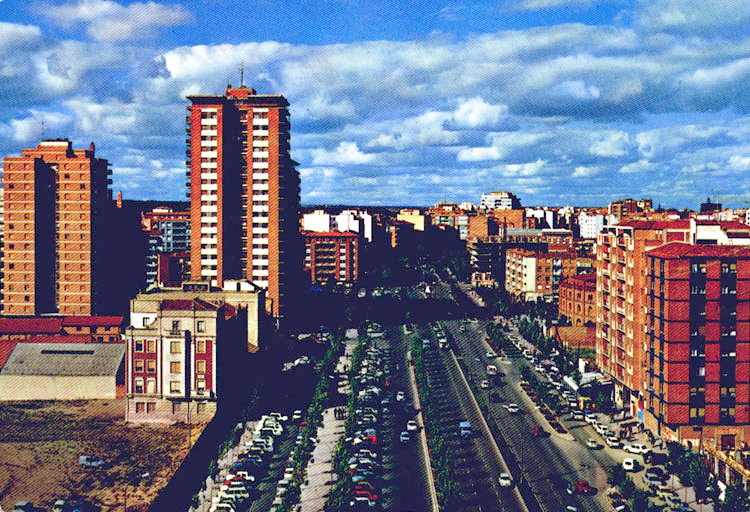
The Paseo de Zorrilla in the 1970s

From 1950 onwards Valladolid became an important industrial centre. This was the context in which companies such as ENDASA (1950), FASA (1954), TECNAUTO (1956) and SAVA (1957) were created. The city was declared as a Polo de Desarrollo Industrial ("Pole for Industrial Development") in 1964. During the 1960 and early 1970s the city attracted many immigrants, chiefly coming from the province of Valladolid and neighbouring provinces. The city started to expand across the western bank of the Pisuerga in the early 1960s.

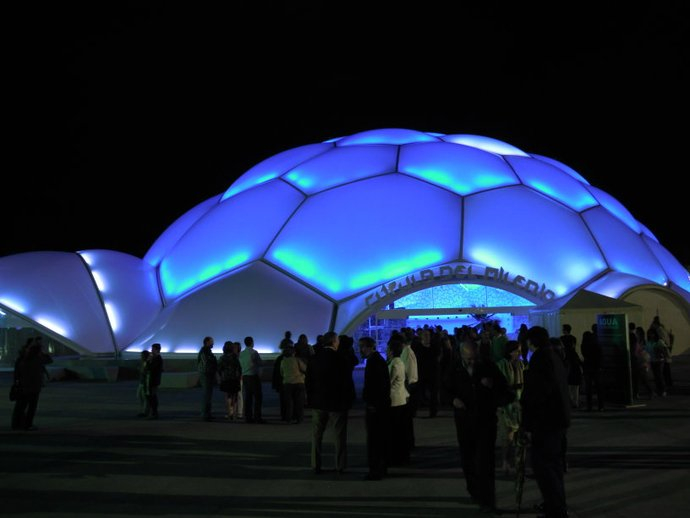
Cúpula del Milenio

In the context of the fraught process for the creation of the autonomous community of Castile and León (completed in 1983), Valladolid vied for the condition of regional capital, competing with other cities, most notably creating a sense of antagonism with Burgos. Although the capital was not explicitly enshrined in the region's statute of autonomy from 1983, Valladolid was designated in 1987 as the de jure seat of the executive and legislative institutions (the Junta of Castile and León and the Cortes of Castile and León).

On 25 June 2024, the church de la Vera Cruz built in 1581 broke down, causing dust to encircle the whole city. This accident was supposedly due to renovation works.

=== Jewish history ===
The earliest documented presence of a Jewish community in Valladoilid dates to 1221. In 1288, Sancho IV prohibited Jews from acquiring land in Valladolid and the surrounding area. In 1322, Christians were prohibited from being treated by Jewish doctors, and could not attend Jewish or Muslim weddings. Furthermore, Jews were barred from positions of public office. In the early 15th century, the Laws of Valladolid were passed with anti-Jewish legislation. These laws stripped the Jews of Valladolid of their autonomy, which included the right to have their own court system. Additionally, Jews and Moors were prohibited from leaving Castille. In 1432, however, officials in Valladolid met with Don Abraham Benveniste in the Jewish quarter of the city, and agreed to restore Jewish autonomy. Converso poet Juan de Valladolid wrote poems criticizing treatment of Jews in Valladolid. Jewish life in Valladolid was nonexistent in the 16th century, after the expulsion of the Jews.

== Geography ==
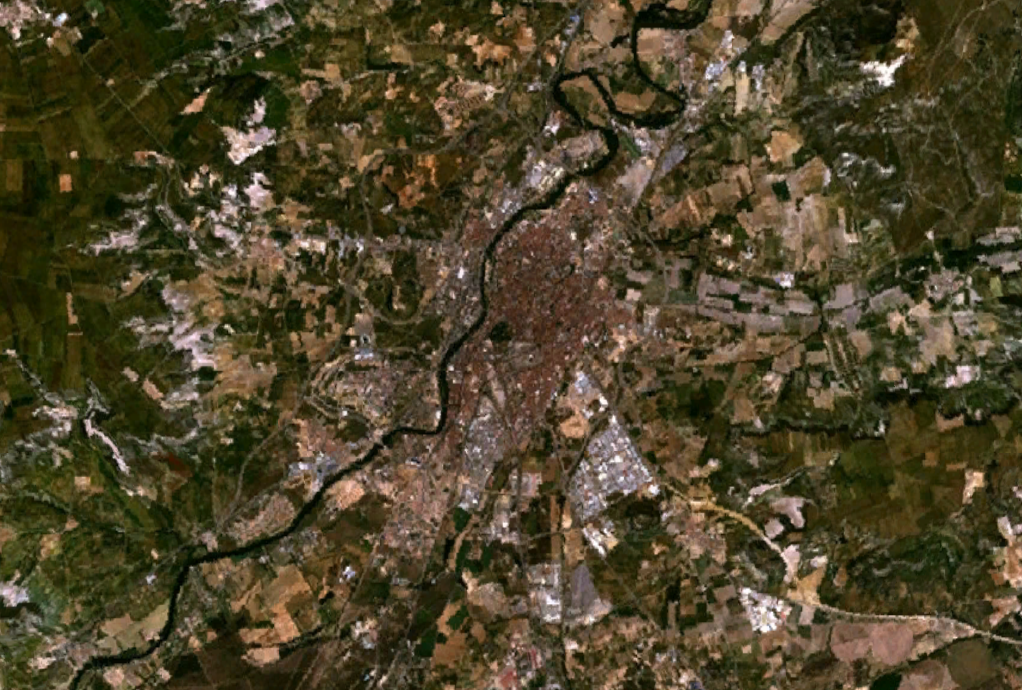
Satellite view of Valladolid

Valladolid is located at roughly 735 metres above sea level, at the centre of the Meseta Norte, the plateau drained by the Duero river basin covering a major part of the Northwest of the Iberian Peninsula. The primitive urban core was built ex novo in the 11th century on a small elevation near the confluence of the Esgueva with the Pisuerga, on the left-bank of the latter river. The city of Valladolid currently lies on both banks of the Pisuerga, a major right-bank tributary of the Douro.

Besides the main territory on which the city lies, the municipality also includes two exclaves: Navabuena (5,129 hectares, hosting the Prison of Villanubla) and El Rebollar (400 hectares).

=== Climate ===
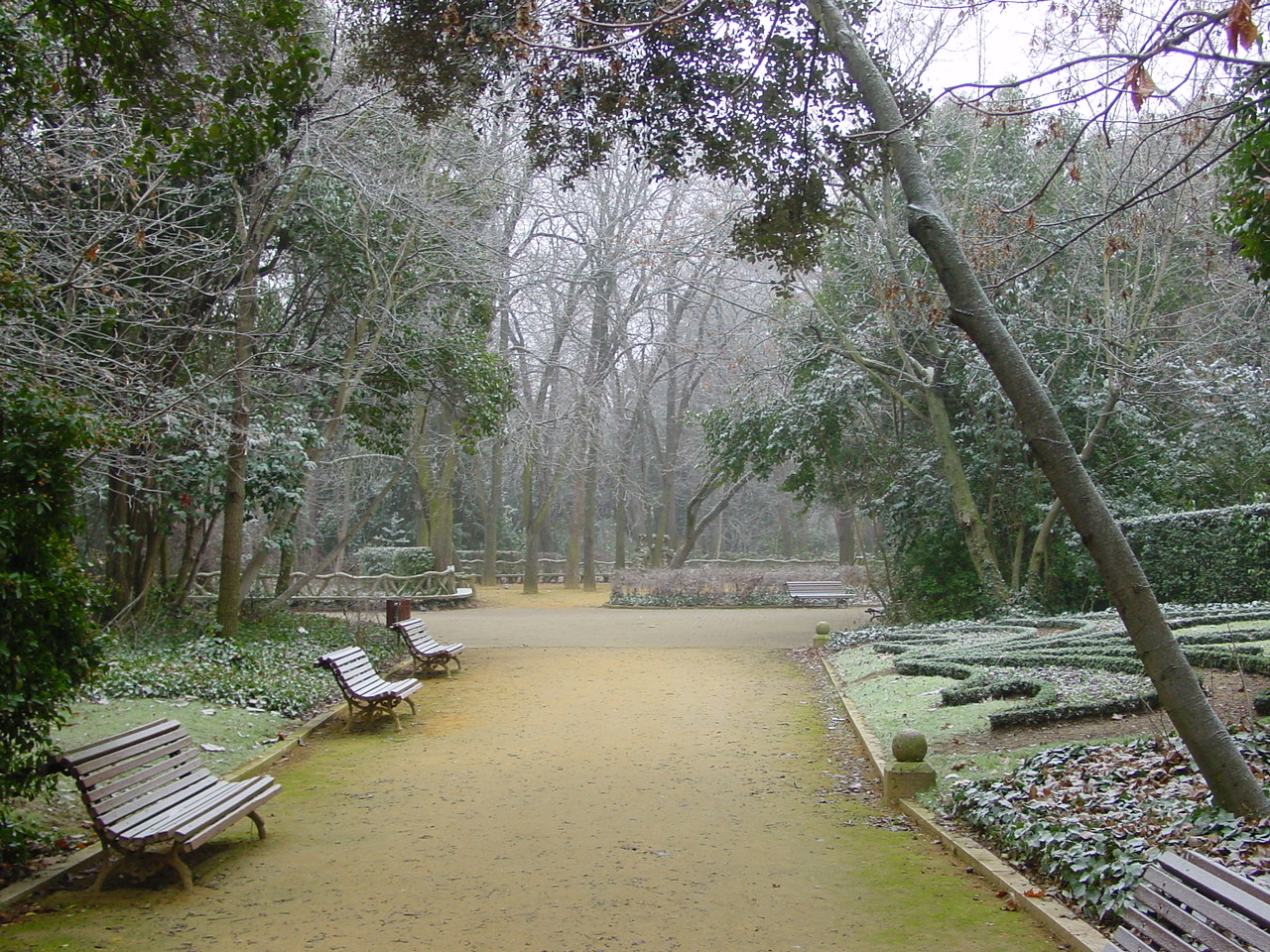
Winter in the city gardens of Campo Grande

The city of Valladolid experiences a continentalized hot-summer Mediterranean (Köppen: Csa) or temperate oceanic (Trewartha: Doak) climate, with influences of a cold semi-arid climate (Köppen: BSk; Trewartha: BSak). Valladolid's climate features cool and windy winters due to altitude and the inland location of the city. Fog is very typical in the morning during winter. Winters experience occasional snow and low temperatures below freezing during cold fronts. Valladolid's climate is influenced by the distance from the sea and its higher altitude.

Valladolid is drier than Spain's northern coastal regions, although there is year-round precipitation. Average annual precipitation is 433 mm (17.0 in) and the average annual relative humidity is 64%.

Climate data for Valladolid WMO ID: 08141; Climate ID: 2422; coordinates 41°38′27″N 04°45′16″W; elevation: 734 m (2,408 ft); 1991–2020 provisional normals, extremes 1973–present
Month	Jan	Feb	Mar	Apr	May	Jun	Jul	Aug	Sep	Oct	Nov	Dec	Year
Record high °C (°F)	18.0 (64.4)	22.9 (73.2)	26.6 (79.9)	30.1 (86.2)	34.5 (94.1)	39.8 (103.6)	41.1 (106.0)	40.0 (104.0)	38.2 (100.8)	33.3 (91.9)	24.0 (75.2)	21.4 (70.5)	41.1 (106.0)
Mean maximum °C (°F)	14.0 (57.2)	17.3 (63.1)	22.1 (71.8)	25.2 (77.4)	30.1 (86.2)	35.4 (95.7)	37.2 (99.0)	36.9 (98.4)	32.5 (90.5)	25.9 (78.6)	19.1 (66.4)	14.4 (57.9)	38.0 (100.4)
Mean daily maximum °C (°F)	8.1 (46.6)	11.2 (52.2)	15.1 (59.2)	17.5 (63.5)	21.9 (71.4)	27.4 (81.3)	30.9 (87.6)	30.4 (86.7)	25.5 (77.9)	19.1 (66.4)	12.3 (54.1)	8.7 (47.7)	19.0 (66.2)
Daily mean °C (°F)	4.4 (39.9)	6.0 (42.8)	9.1 (48.4)	11.3 (52.3)	15.2 (59.4)	19.8 (67.6)	22.7 (72.9)	22.5 (72.5)	18.5 (65.3)	13.6 (56.5)	8.0 (46.4)	5.0 (41.0)	13.0 (55.4)
Mean daily minimum °C (°F)	0.7 (33.3)	0.8 (33.4)	3.1 (37.6)	5.2 (41.4)	8.5 (47.3)	12.2 (54.0)	14.4 (57.9)	14.5 (58.1)	11.5 (52.7)	8.0 (46.4)	3.8 (38.8)	1.4 (34.5)	7.0 (44.6)
Mean minimum °C (°F)	−4.8 (23.4)	−4.0 (24.8)	−2.2 (28.0)	−0.4 (31.3)	2.5 (36.5)	6.4 (43.5)	9.3 (48.7)	9.5 (49.1)	6.1 (43.0)	1.8 (35.2)	−1.9 (28.6)	−4.5 (23.9)	−6.3 (20.7)
Record low °C (°F)	−11.0 (12.2)	−11.5 (11.3)	−10.2 (13.6)	−6.0 (21.2)	−1.7 (28.9)	2.6 (36.7)	3.2 (37.8)	3.6 (38.5)	0.0 (32.0)	−3.4 (25.9)	−6.8 (19.8)	−10.8 (12.6)	−11.5 (11.3)
Average precipitation mm (inches)	44.8 (1.76)	24.0 (0.94)	31.6 (1.24)	48.5 (1.91)	46.4 (1.83)	27.0 (1.06)	12.9 (0.51)	12.2 (0.48)	29.4 (1.16)	61.3 (2.41)	50.3 (1.98)	45.0 (1.77)	433.5 (17.07)
Average precipitation days (≥ 1 mm)	6.8	4.9	6.2	7.9	7.2	4.1	2.1	2.0	4.3	7.9	7.3	6.7	67.4
Average snowy days	2.7	2.5	1.1	0.7	0.0	0.0	0.0	0.0	0.0	0.0	0.4	0.9	8.3
Average relative humidity (%)	84.0	72.4	63.7	62.2	57.7	49.6	44.2	45.7	54.9	68.9	79.7	84.7	64.0
Mean monthly sunshine hours	102	158	217	240	285	327	366	338	267	192	123	96	2,711
Percentage possible sunshine	34.2	52.7	58.6	59.6	63.0	72.1	79.2	78.6	71.0	55.6	41.1	33.2	58.2
Source: State Meteorological Agency/AEMET OpenData

Climate data for Valladolid, 1981-2010 normals
Month	Jan	Feb	Mar	Apr	May	Jun	Jul	Aug	Sep	Oct	Nov	Dec	Year
Mean daily maximum °C (°F)	8.2 (46.8)	11.2 (52.2)	15.2 (59.4)	16.9 (62.4)	21.0 (69.8)	27.0 (80.6)	30.7 (87.3)	30.1 (86.2)	25.6 (78.1)	18.9 (66.0)	12.4 (54.3)	8.6 (47.5)	18.8 (65.8)
Daily mean °C (°F)	4.2 (39.6)	5.9 (42.6)	9.0 (48.2)	10.7 (51.3)	14.5 (58.1)	19.3 (66.7)	22.1 (71.8)	22.1 (71.8)	18.5 (65.3)	13.2 (55.8)	7.9 (46.2)	5.0 (41.0)	12.7 (54.9)
Mean daily minimum °C (°F)	0.2 (32.4)	0.7 (33.3)	2.8 (37.0)	4.6 (40.3)	7.9 (46.2)	11.6 (52.9)	14.0 (57.2)	14.1 (57.4)	11.3 (52.3)	7.6 (45.7)	3.5 (38.3)	1.3 (34.3)	6.6 (43.9)
Average precipitation mm (inches)	40 (1.6)	27 (1.1)	22 (0.9)	46 (1.8)	49 (1.9)	29 (1.1)	13 (0.5)	16 (0.6)	31 (1.2)	55 (2.2)	52 (2.0)	53 (2.1)	433 (17.0)
Average precipitation days (≥ 1.0 mm)	6.3	5.2	4.8	7.8	7.9	4.5	2.1	2.3	4.3	7.5	7.1	7.7	67.7
Average snowy days	3.0	2.1	0.8	0.8	0.0	0.0	0.0	0.0	0.0	0.0	0.7	1.4	8.8
Average relative humidity (%)	83	72	62	62	60	52	45	48	56	70	79	84	64
Mean monthly sunshine hours	101	147	215	232	272	322	363	334	254	182	117	89	2,624
Source 1: Agencia Estatal de Meteorología
Source 2: Atlas Agroclimático Castilla y León

== Administration ==
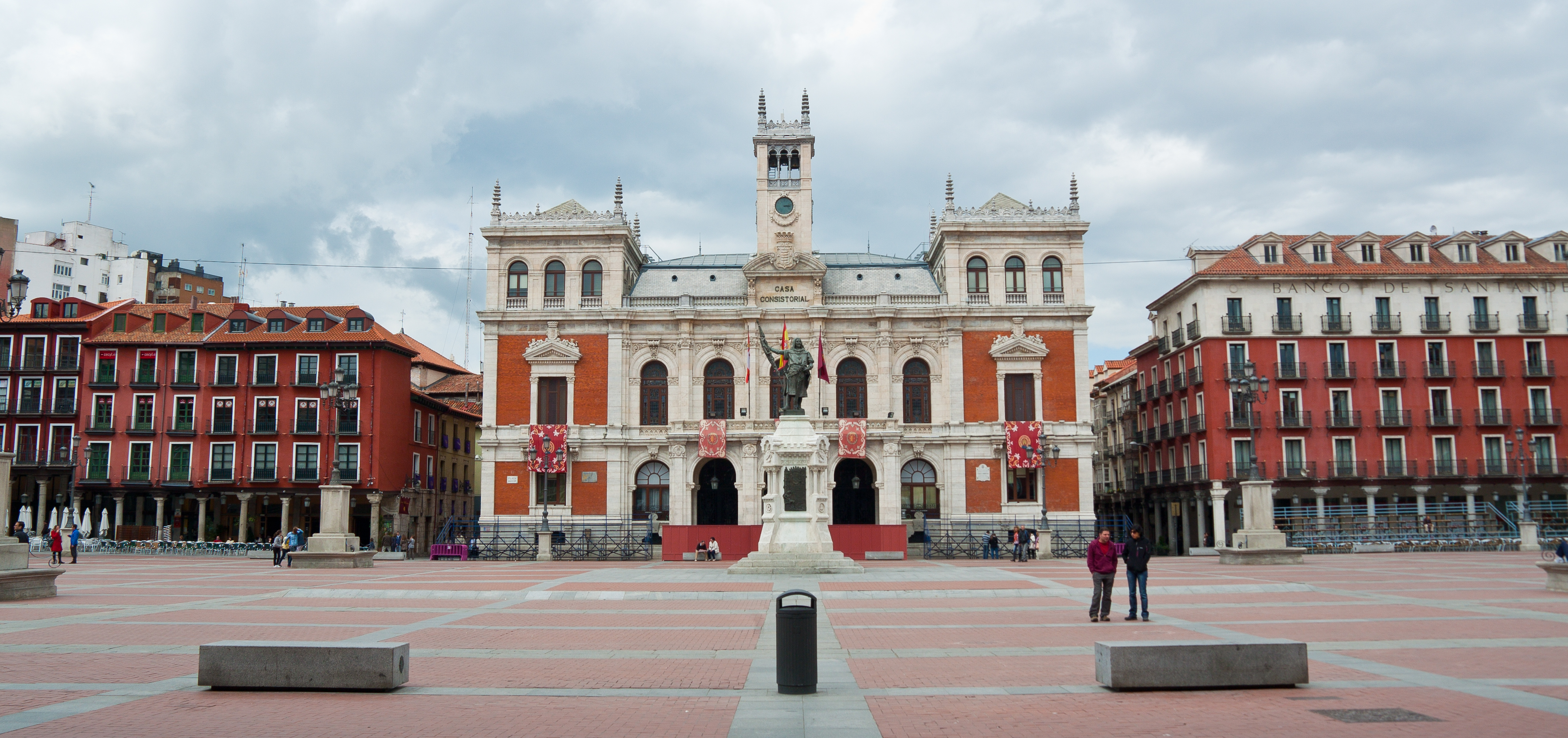
The façade of the City Hall at the Plaza Mayor

Valladolid is a municipality, the basic local administrative division in Spain. The Ayuntamiento de Valladolid is the body charged with the municipal government and administration. The Plenary of the ayuntamiento is formed by 27 elected municipal councillors, who in turn invest the mayor. The last municipal election took place on 26 May 2019. Since 2015, Óscar Puente (PSOE) serves as Mayor. He renewed his spell for a second mandate following the 2019 election.

== Demographics ==
Historical population
Year	Pop.	±%
1842	19,511	—
1857	42,285	+116.7%
1877	55,042	+30.2%
1887	65,126	+18.3%
1900	71,328	+9.5%
1910	72,571	+1.7%
1920	76,280	+5.1%
1930	90,659	+18.9%
1940	109,538	+20.8%
1950	120,294	+9.8%
1960	150,959	+25.5%
1970	233,974	+55.0%
1981	320,293	+36.9%
1991	330,700	+3.2%
2001	316,580	−4.3%
2011	311,682	−1.5%
2021	297,370	−4.6%
Source: INE

As of 2024, the population of the city proper of Valladolid is 299,816, and the population of the entire urban area is estimated to be 406,923 as of 2015. The most important municipalities of the urban area are (after Valladolid itself) Laguna de Duero and Boecillo on the south, Arroyo de la Encomienda, Zaratán, Simancas and Villanubla on the west, Cigales and Santovenia de Pisuerga on the north, and Tudela de Duero and Cistérniga on the east.

After new neighbourhoods developed in recent decades, like Covaresa, the high prices in the municipality led young people to buy properties in towns around the city, due to which the population has fallen in Valladolid but is growing fast in other peri-urban areas (for example, Arroyo de la Encomienda or Zaratán).

As of 2024, the foreign-born population of the city is 33,307, equal to 11.1% of the total population.

Foreign population by country of birth (2024)
Nationality	Population
Colombia	5,274
Morocco	3,997
Venezuela	2,993
Dominican Republic	2,445
Bulgaria	1,690
Peru	1,683
Ecuador	1,477
Brazil	1,299
Romania	1,264
Cuba	913
France	887
Argentina	781
Bolivia	700
Ukraine	607
China	573

== Economy ==
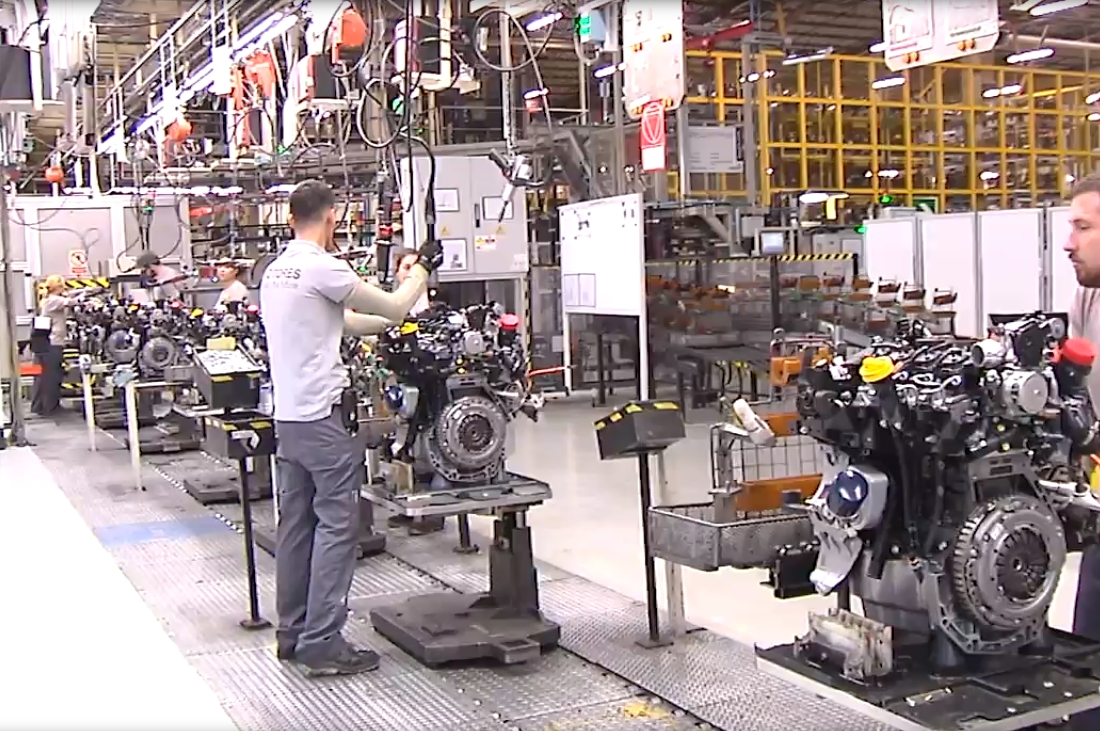
Renault factory in Valladolid

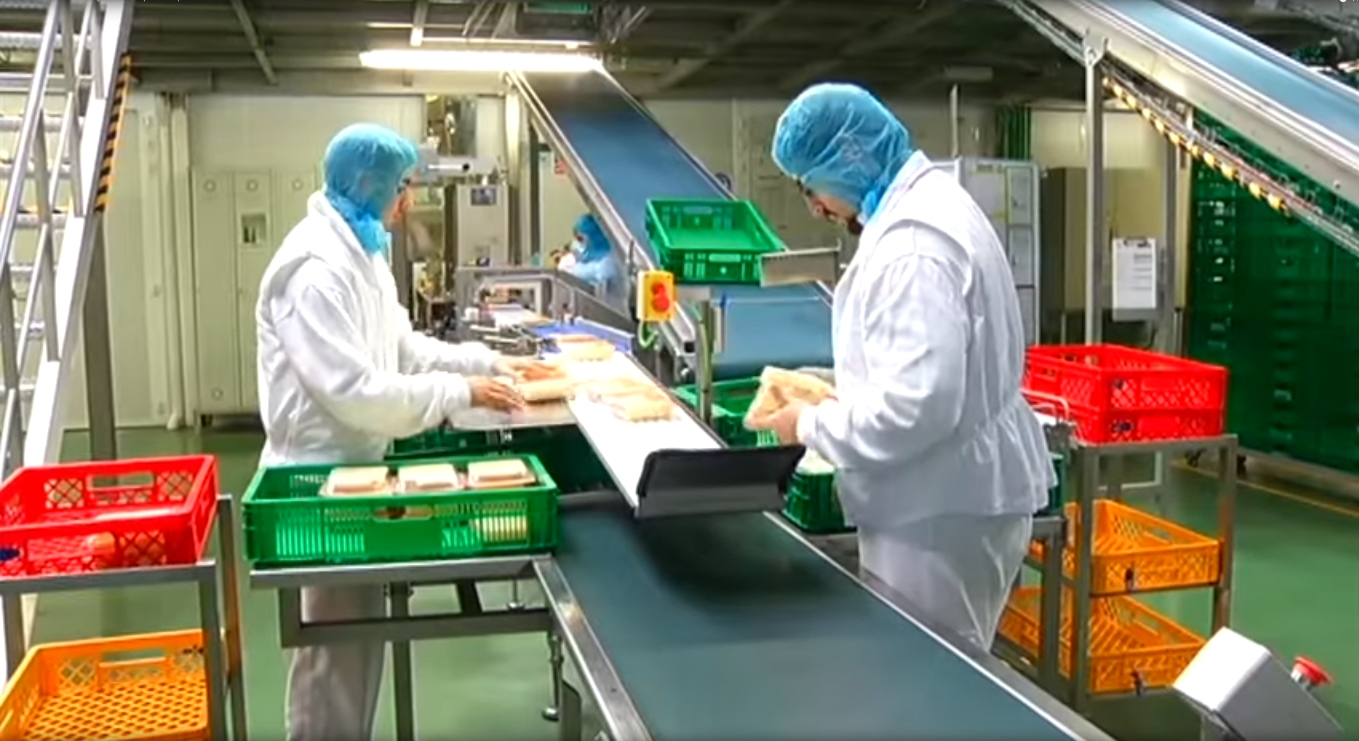
Activity in the logistics centre of Entrepinares

Valladolid is a major economic center in Spain. The automotive industry is one of the major motors of the city's economy since the founding of FASA-Renault in 1953 for the assembling of Renault branded vehicles, which would later become Renault España. Four years later, in 1957, Sava was founded and started producing commercial vehicles. Sava would later be absorbed by Pegaso and since 1990 by the Italian truck manufacturer Iveco. Together with the French tire manufacturer Michelin, Renault and Iveco form the most important industrial companies of the city.

Besides the automotive and automotive auxiliary industries, other important industrial sectors are food processing (with local companies like Acor and Queserías Entrepinares and facilities of multinationals like Cadbury, Lactalis or Lesaffre), metallurgy (Lingotes Especiales, Saeta die Casting...), chemical and printing. In total 22 013 people were employed in 2007 in industrial workplaces, representing 14.0% of total workers.

The main economic sector of Valladolid in terms of employment is however the service sector, which employs 111,988 people, representing 74.2% of Valladolid workers affiliated to Social Security.

The construction sector employed 15,493 people in 2007, representing 10.3% of total workers.

Finally, agriculture is a tiny sector in the city which only employs 2,355 people (1.5% of the total). The predominant crops are wheat, barley and sugar beet.

Top 10 companies by turnover in 2013 in € million were: Renault (4 596), Michelin (2 670), Iveco (1 600), the Valladolid-based supermarket chain Grupo El Árbol (849), cheese processing Queserías Entrepinares (204), sugar processing Acor (201), service group Grupo Norte (174), automobile auxiliary company Faurecia-Asientos de Castilla y León (143), Sada (129) and Hipereco (108).

== Education ==
Education management and policing in Valladolid depends on the Ministry of Education of the Government of Castile and León, the department responsible for the education at the regional level, both at the university and non-university level.

=== Universities ===
==== University of Valladolid ====
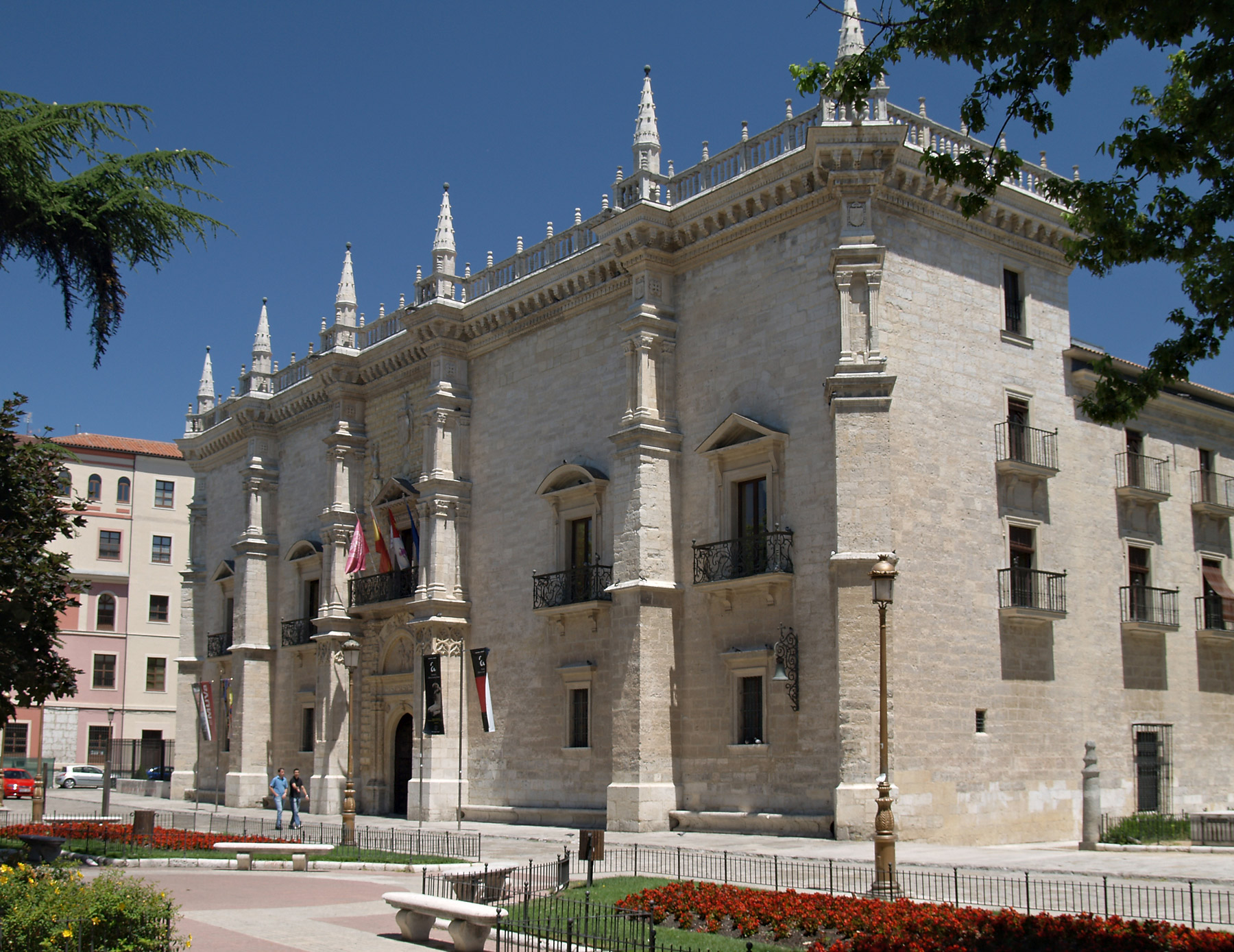
The Palacio de Santa Cruz houses the UVA's rectorate.

The University of Valladolid (UVA) was founded in 1241 by Alfonso VIII of Castille. It is one of the oldest universities in the world. It has four campuses around the city (Huerta del Rey, Centro, Río Esgueva and Miguel Delibes) as well as another three campuses scattered around the wider region of Castile and León (Palencia, Soria and Segovia). Spread over 25 colleges and their associated centers, about 2000 teachers give classes to more than 23,800 students enrolled in 2011.

It also features the 25 centers, a number of administrative buildings such as the Palacio de Santa Cruz, where the rector, and the Museum of the University of Valladolid (MUVa), The House of Students, featuring the other administrative services mainly related to international relations, or CTI (Center for Information Technology), both located in the basement of the University Residence Alfonso VIII, next to the old Faculty of Science.

==== Miguel de Cervantes European University ====
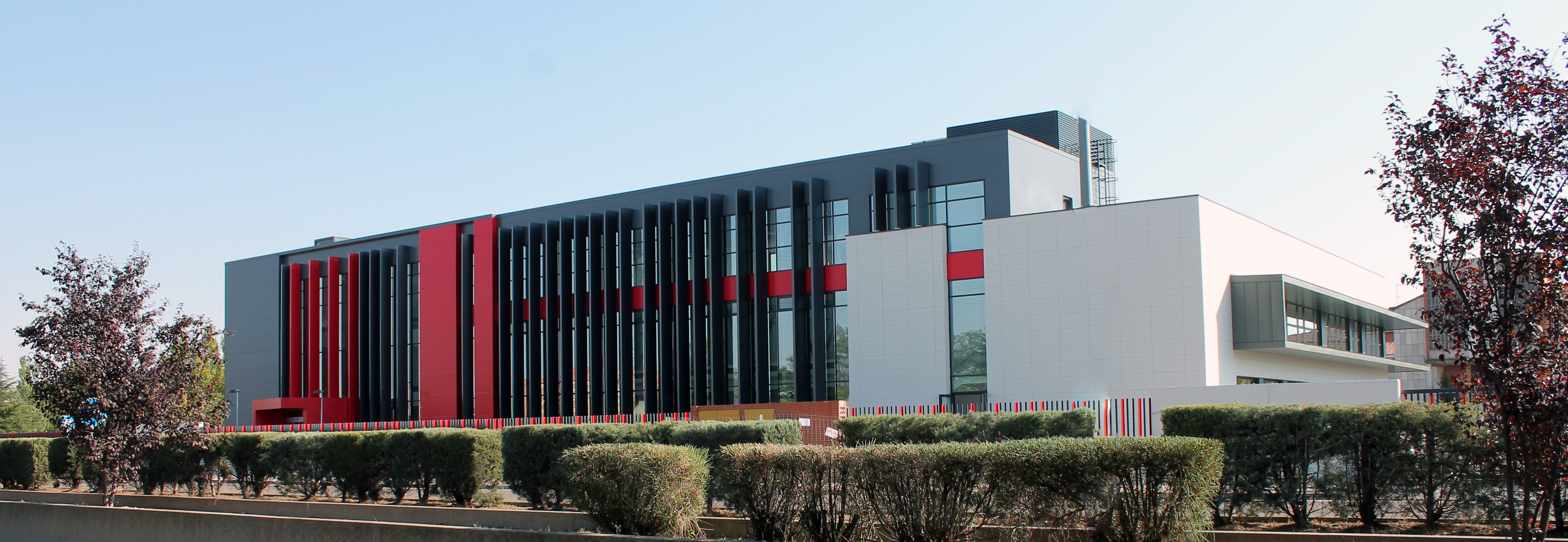
UEMC University

The Miguel de Cervantes European University (Universidad Europea Miguel de Cervantes; UEMC) is a private university with roughly 1,500 students. It is spread over three faculties: Social Sciences, Law and Economics, Health and the Polytechnic School. It has later expanded its campus with a new facility doubling the area devoted to teaching and research. It also has a dental clinic and a library.

=== Primary and secondary schools ===
Lycée Français de Castilla y León, a French international school, is near Valladolid, in Laguna de Duero. San Juán Bautista de La Salle School, a High Private College in Valladolid. Integral and Superior Education. Integrates Kindergarten, Primary School and High School.

== Architecture ==
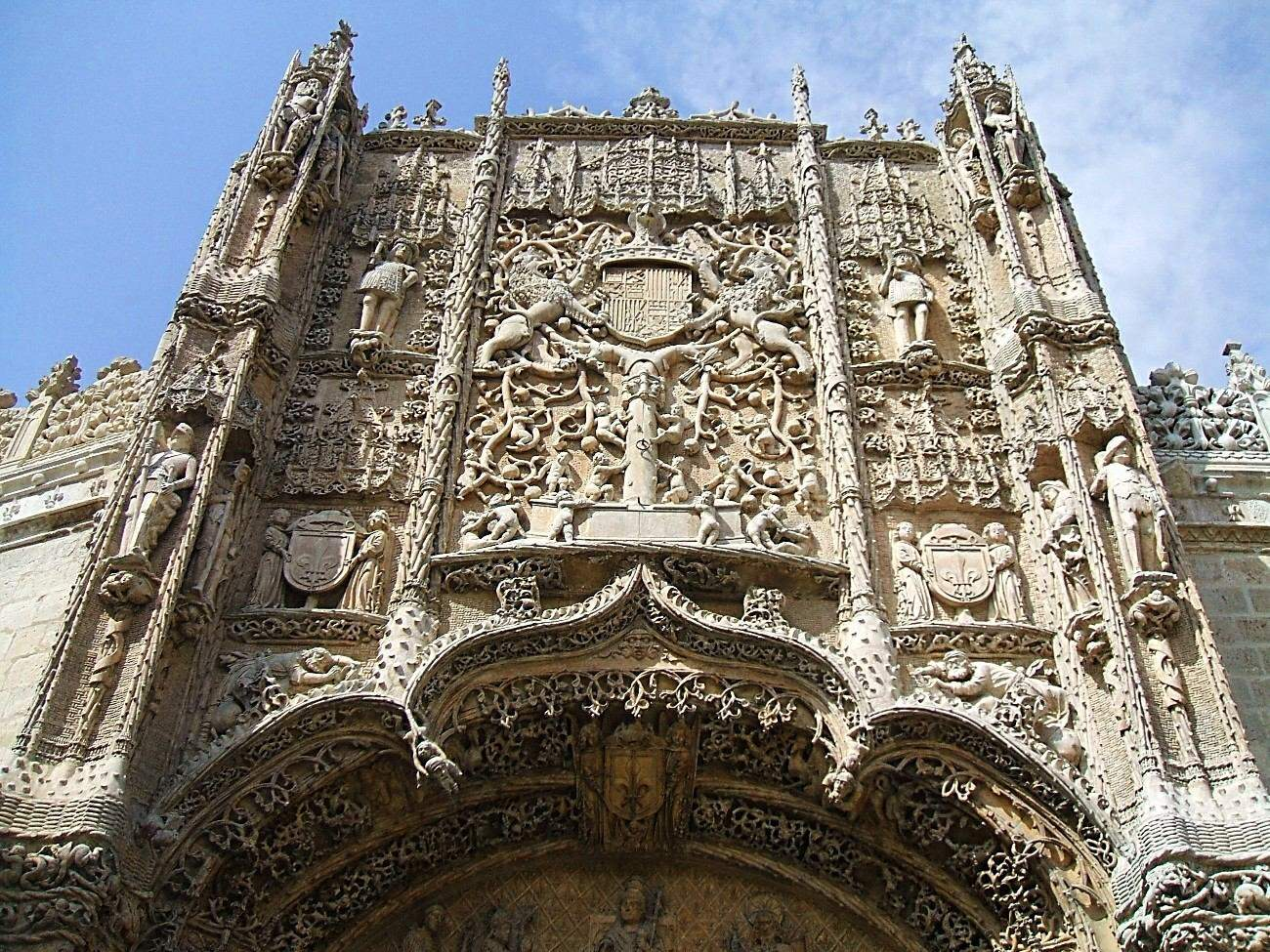
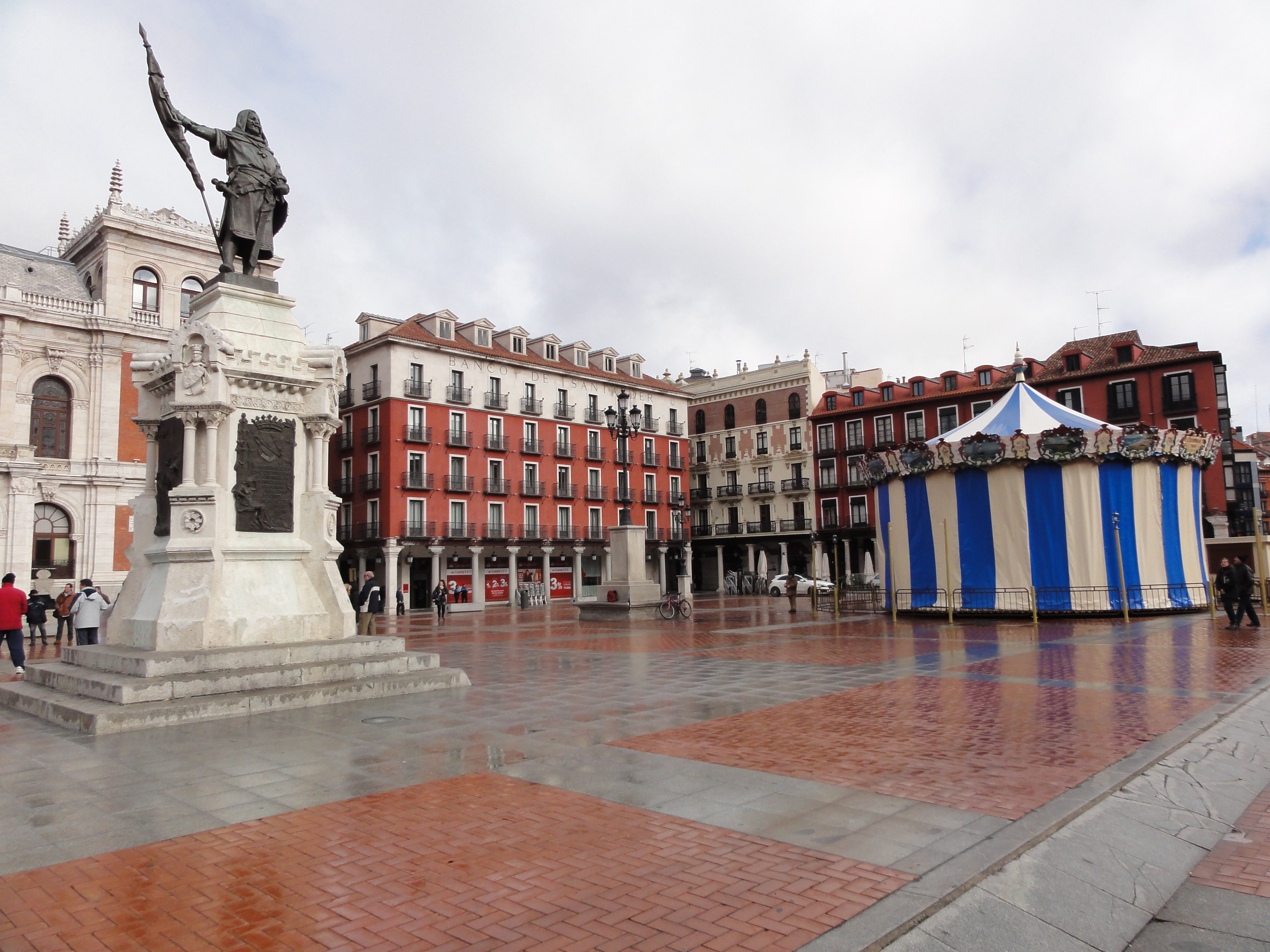
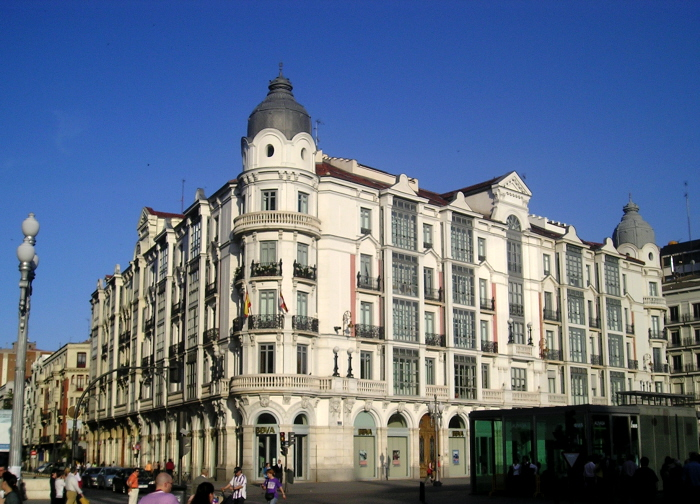
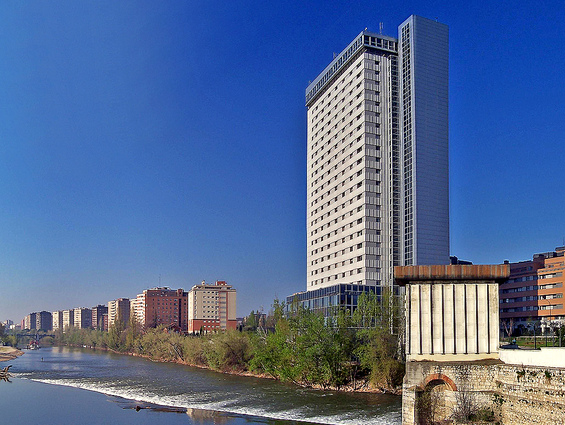
Clockwise, from upper left: the façade of San Gregorio; the Plaza Mayor (with the Monument to Ansúrez); the Duque de Lerma Building (the ceiling of the city); and Casa Mantilla

12th century romanesque architecture is present in the belltowers of the churches of Santa María La Antigua and San Martín.

The School of San Gregorio has been highlighted as an outstanding example Late Gothic architecture (Isabelline gothic). The Gothic style is also present in the Church of San Pablo (featuring also Renaissance and plateresque elements). The late 15th century Palace of Santa Cruz (current seat of the rectorate of the University of Valladolid) has been noted as a pioneer example of Renaissance art in Spain.

The monumental Plaza Mayor, considered the first in its genre in Spain, was projected by Francisco de Salamanca by 1561–62, following the great fire of 1561. The porticoed plaza distinctly employs stone columns with wooden footings and lintels. The design of the façades of the plaza served as template for a number of buildings in nearby streets.

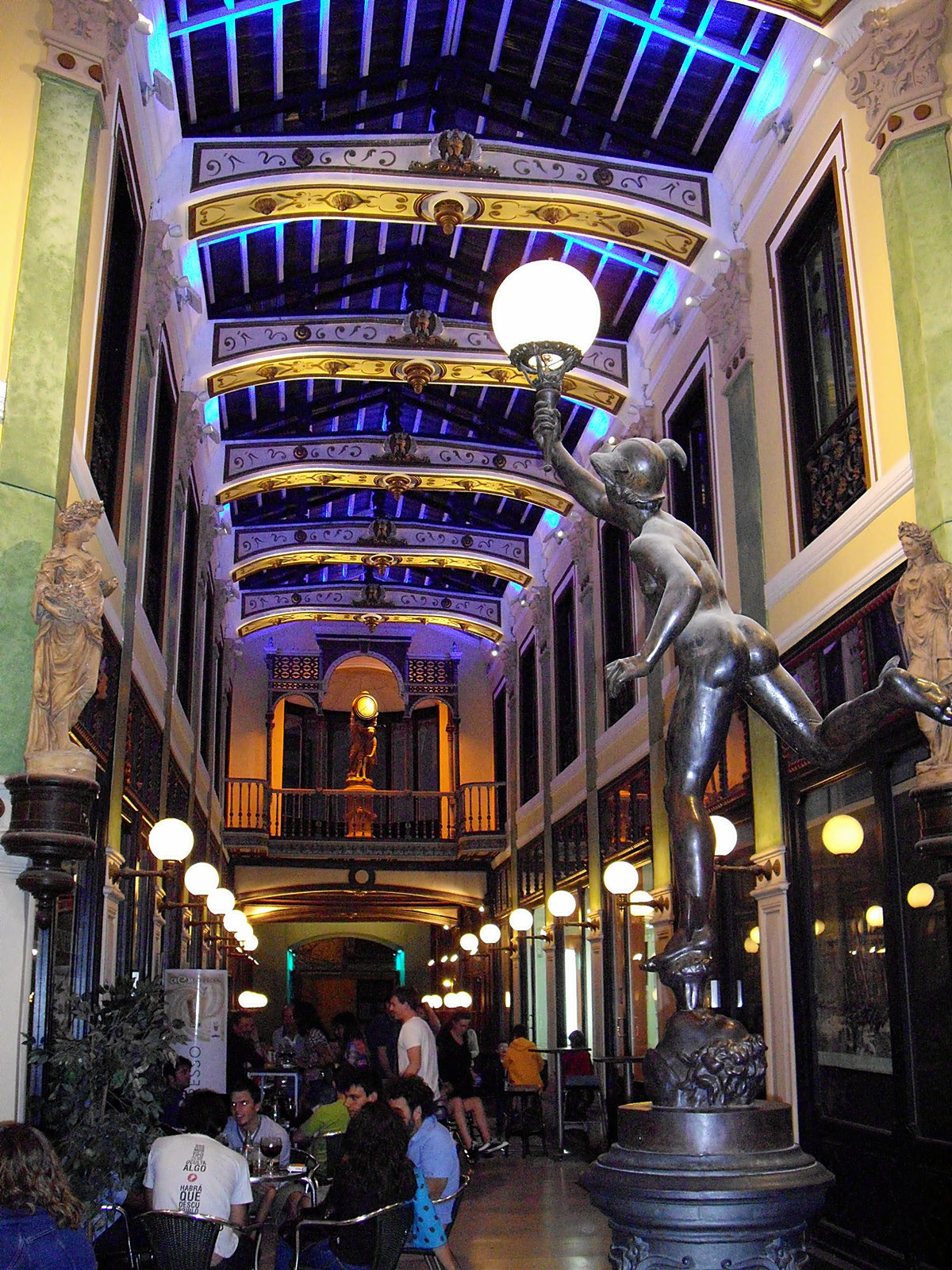
Passage Gutiérrez (1886)

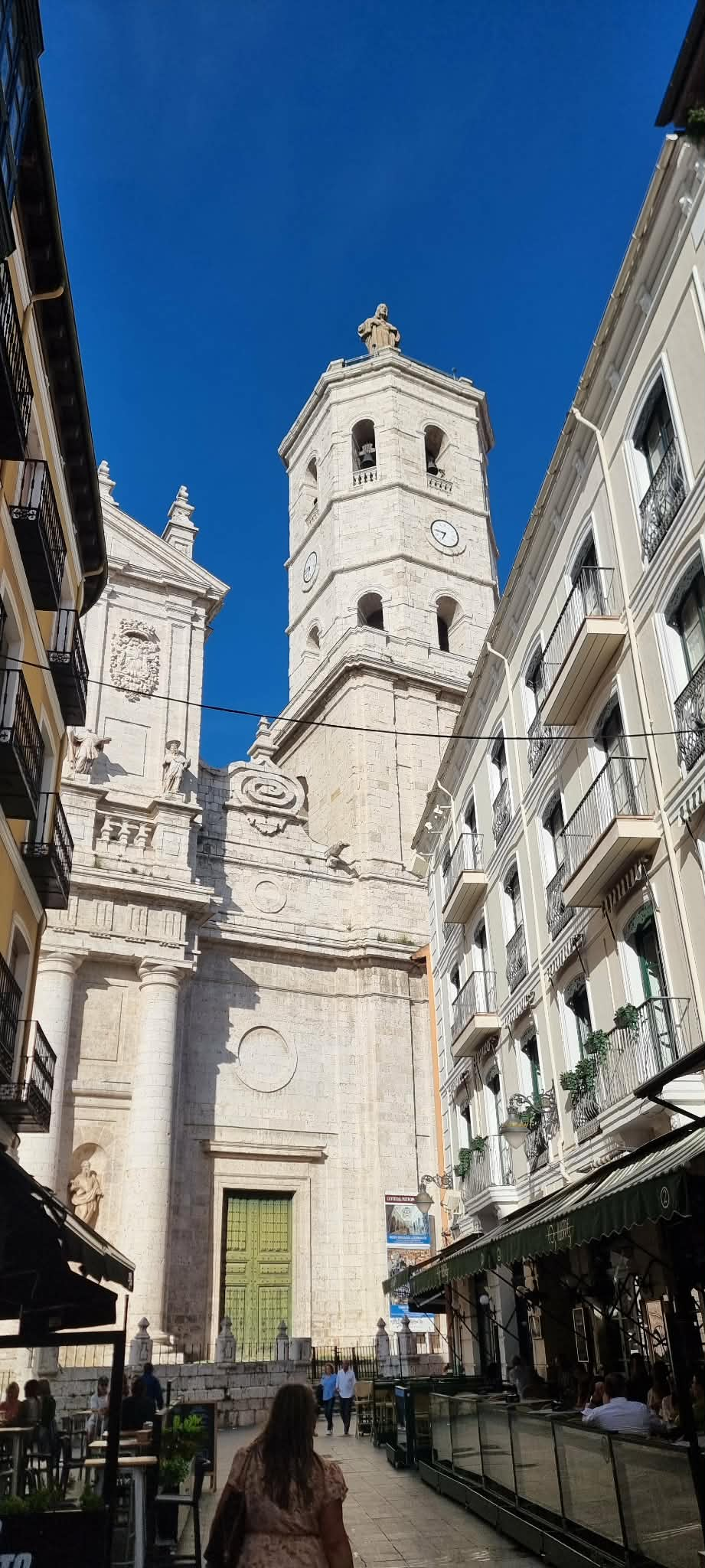
The view from C. Cascajares of the tower of the Cathedral of Valladolid showing the clock and the Statue of the Sacred Heart

The unfinished Cathedral of Valladolid, initially projected by Juan de Herrera in the 16th century (intending to follow a Mannerist style) experienced protracted building works owing to financial problems and its main body was not opened until 1668. Decades later, in 1730, Alberto de Churriguera finished the work on the main front.

The Teatro Lope de Vega is a theater built in the classical style in 1861 and now very run-down. There has been recent controversy over whether the city should pay to restore it. The Campo Grande, a large public park located in the heart of the city, dates back to 1787. Architect Modesto Coloma Palenzuela left a key imprint in the city's outline, authoring many housing projects in the late 19th to early 20th century, with a good number of his buildings still standing. Standout examples of Eclectic architecture from the late 19th and early 20th century in the city include the neoplateresque City Hall, the cavalry academy, Palace of Correos y Telégrafos (defaced in a revamp undergone in the 1960s), and the neobaroque new building for the university.

The Francoist dictatorship left an example of "Imperial Architecture" of neo-herrerian (or escurialense) style in the building for the Seminario Menor, clearly influenced by the Spanish capital's Ministry of the Air.

The city preserves the residences of iconic city neighbors such as the Casa de Cervantes and the house of José Zorrilla. The Christopher Columbus House-Museum, by contrast, is a 1960s reconstruction.

== Transport ==
=== Public transport ===
Urban transit system was based on the Valladolid tram network from 1881 to 1933. A public urban bus system started in 1928, managed by different private tenders until 1982, when the service was taken over by the municipality. Today the public company AUVASA operates the network, with 22 regular lines and five late night lines.

=== High-speed rail ===
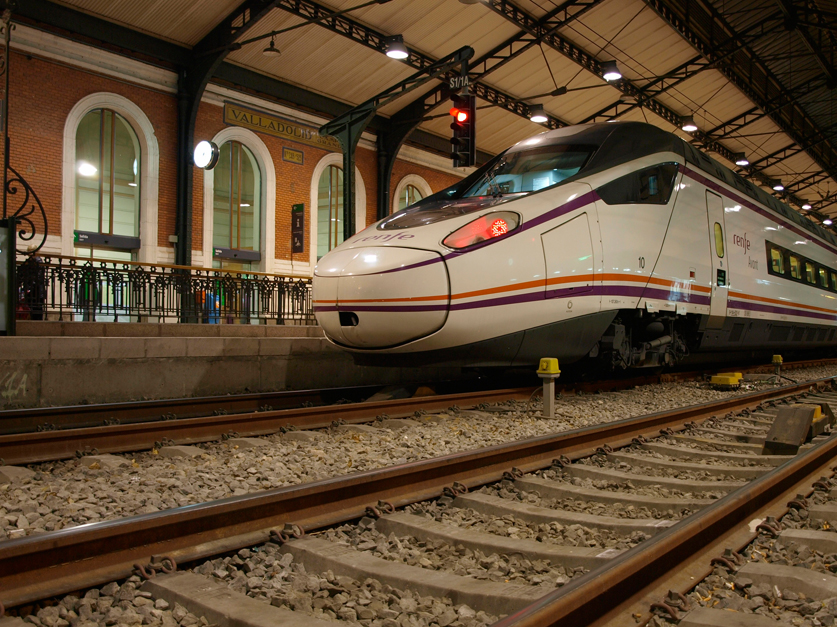
Avant train stationed at Valladolid-Campo Grande

Valladolid-Campo Grande railway station is integrated into the Spanish high-speed network AVE. The Madrid–Valladolid high-speed rail line was inaugurated on 22 December 2007. The line links both cities, crossing the Sierra de Guadarrama through the namesake tunnel, the fourth longest train tunnel in Europe. Valladolid will become the hub for all AVE lines connecting the north and north-west of Spain with the rest of the country. Trainsets used on this line include S-114 (max speed 250 km/h (155 mph)), S-130 (Patito, max speed 250 km/h (155 mph)) and the S102 (Pato, max speed 320 km/h or 199 mph). This line connects the city with Madrid, which can be reached in 56 minutes.

=== Roads ===
Several highways connect the city to the rest of the country.

=== Airport ===
The airport serving the city is not located within the municipal limits, but in Villanubla. The airport has connections to Barcelona, Málaga, and the Canary Islands.

== Culture ==
=== Languages ===
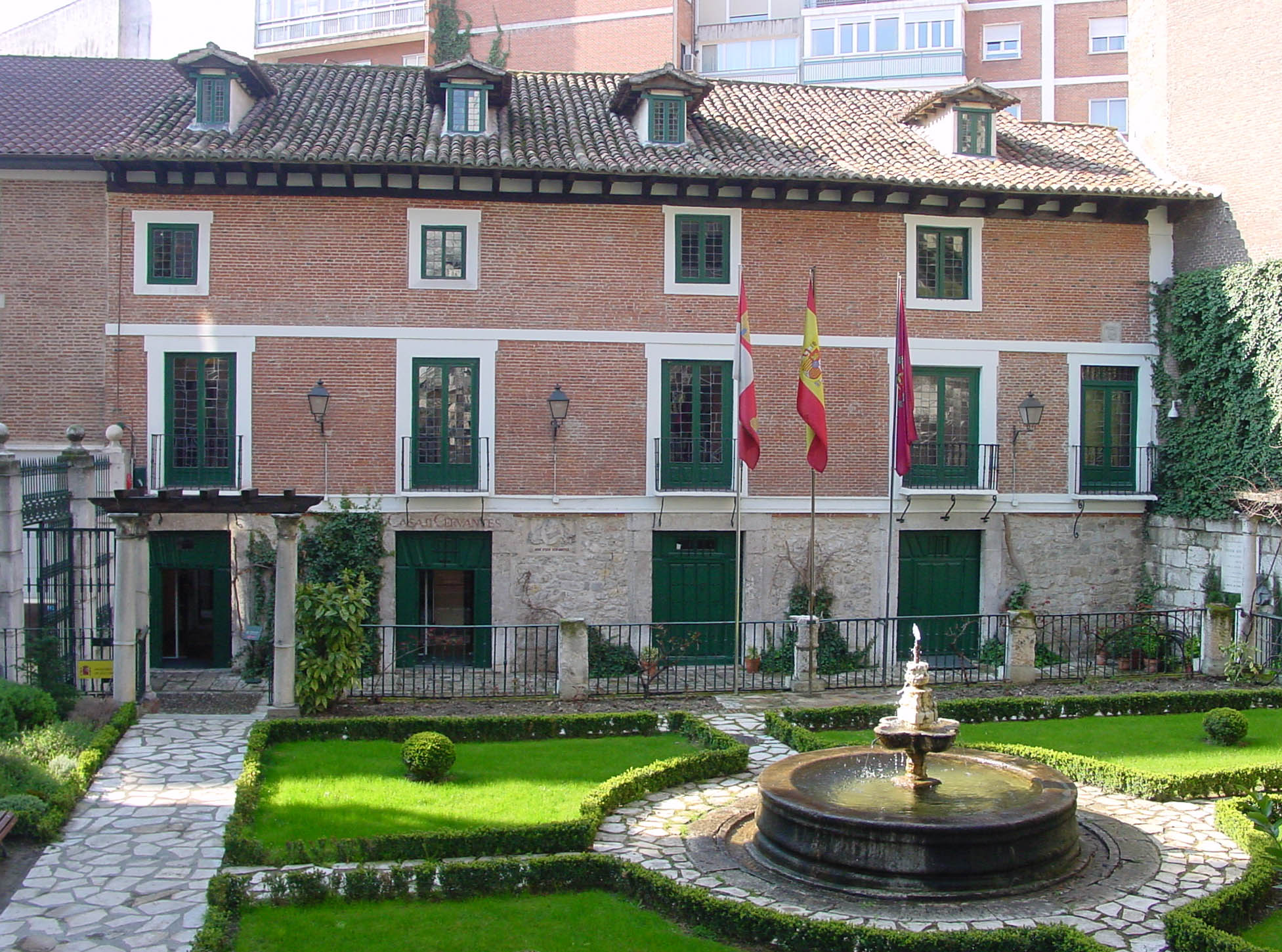
Casa de Cervantes ("Cervantes' House")

Spanish is the only official language throughout the city. Valladolid stands out for having been the residence of the author of Don Quixote, Miguel de Cervantes, as well as authors such as José Zorrilla or Miguel Delibes and the thrust of its University. The province stands out for receiving a significant number of people who want to learn the Spanish language (Language tourism).

=== Easter ===
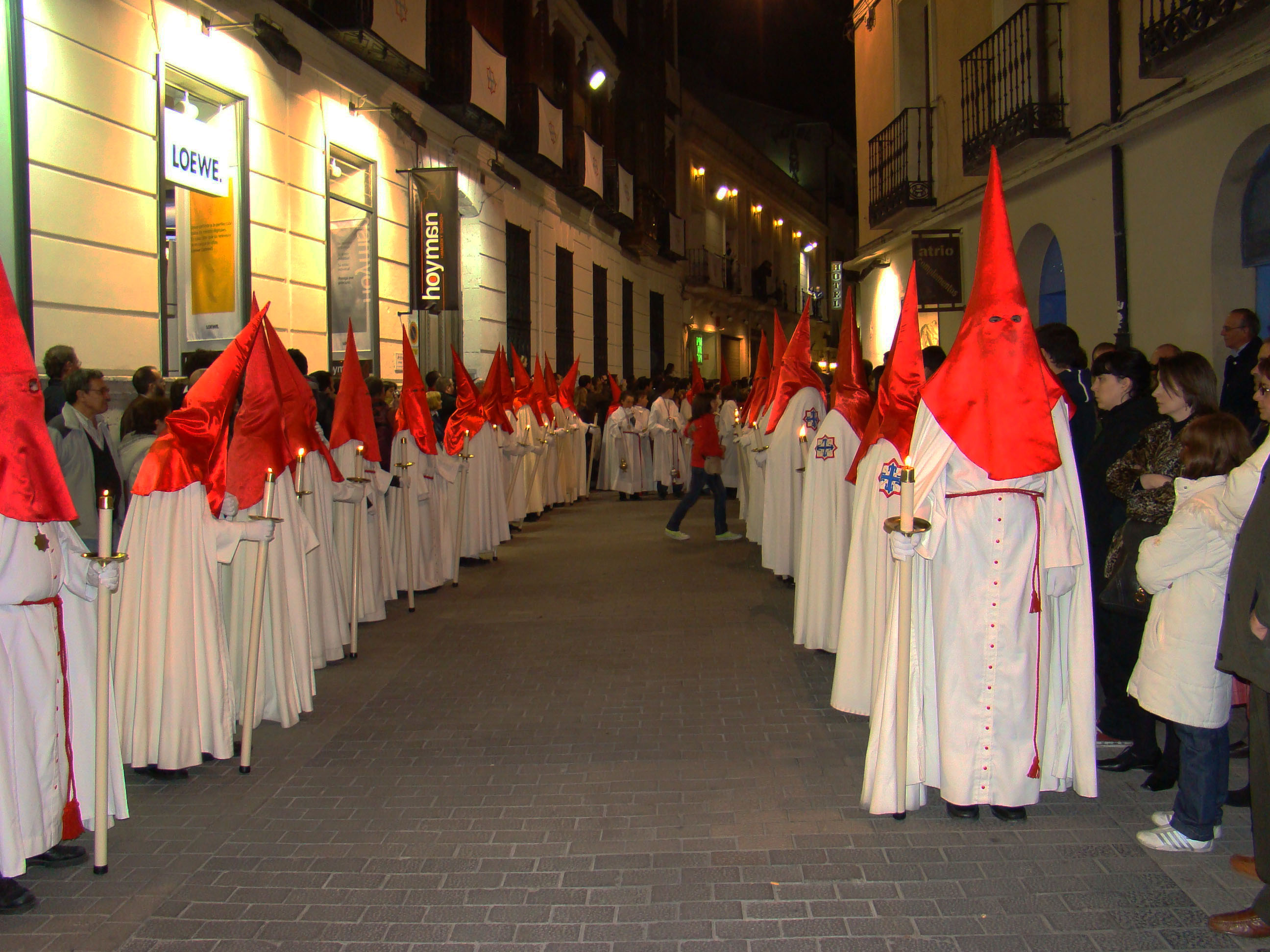
Holy Week procession in the city

Holy Week ("Semana Santa" in Spanish) holds one of the best known Catholic traditions in Valladolid. The Good Friday processions are considered an exquisite and rich display of Castilian religious sculpture. On this day, in the morning, members of the brotherhoods on horseback make a poetic proclamation throughout the city. The "Sermon of the Seven Words" is spoken in Plaza Mayor Square. In the afternoon, thousands of people take part in the Passion Procession, comprising 31 pasos (religious statues), most of which date from the 16th and 17th centuries. The last statue in the procession is the Virgen de las Angustias, and her return to the church is one of the most emotional moments of the celebrations, with the Salve Popular sung in her honour.

Easter is one of the most spectacular and emotional fiestas in Valladolid. Religious devotion, art, colour and music combine in acts to commemorate the resurrection of Jesus Christ: the processions. Members of the different Easter brotherhoods, dressed in their characteristic robes, parade through the streets carrying religious statues (pasos) to the sound of drums and music.

=== Seminci ===
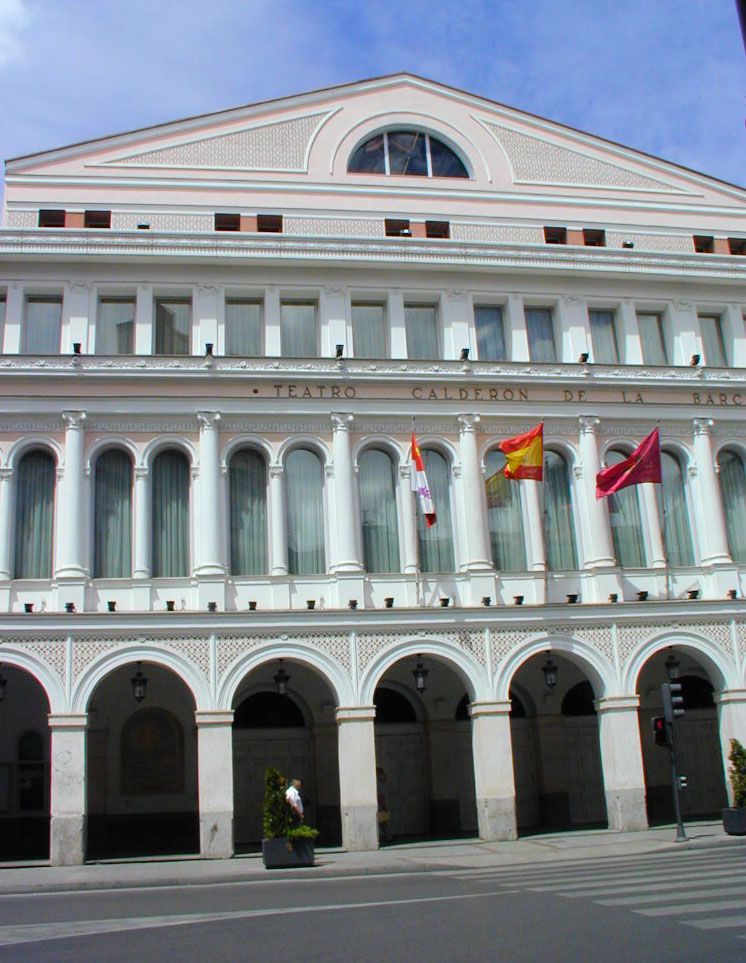
Calderón Theatre is the festival headquarters.

The city is also host to one of the foremost (and oldest) international film festivals, the Semana Internacional de Cine de Valladolid (Seminci), founded in 1956. Valladolid, through various loopholes in state censorship, was able to present films that would otherwise have been impossible to see in Spain. An award or an enthusiastic reception from the audience and the critics meant, on numerous occasions, that the official state bodies gave the go-ahead to certain films which Francisco Franco's regime considered out of line with their ideology.

Even after the death of Franco in 1975, Valladolid continued to be the "testing ground" for films which had been banned. For example, the premiere in Spain of Stanley Kubrick's A Clockwork Orange at the 1975 festival is still recalled as a landmark.

=== Local cuisine ===
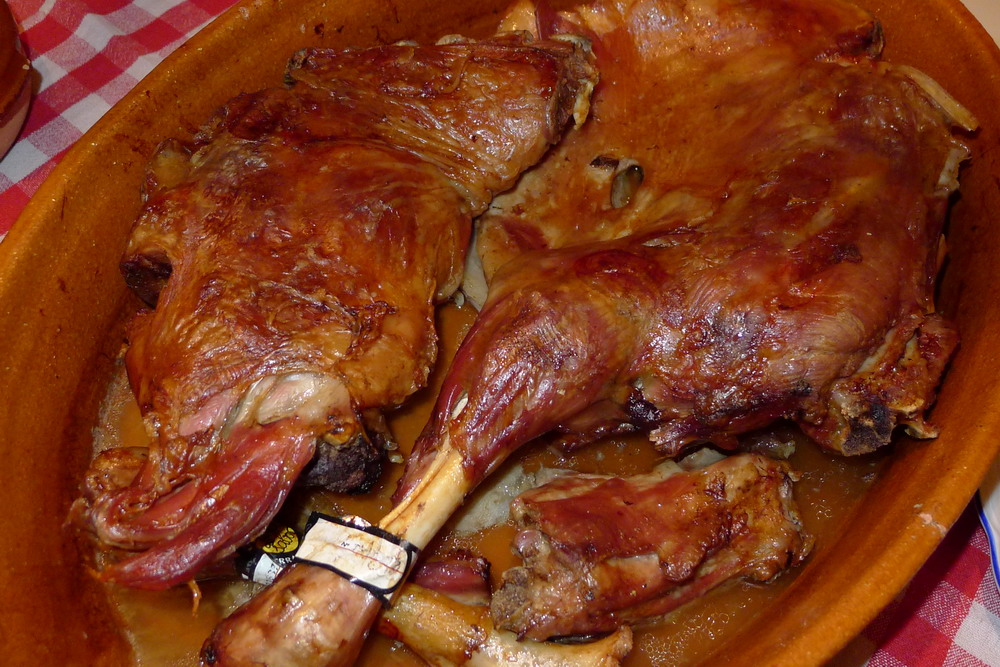
The roasted lechazo (unweaned lamb) is a staple of the provincial cuisine.

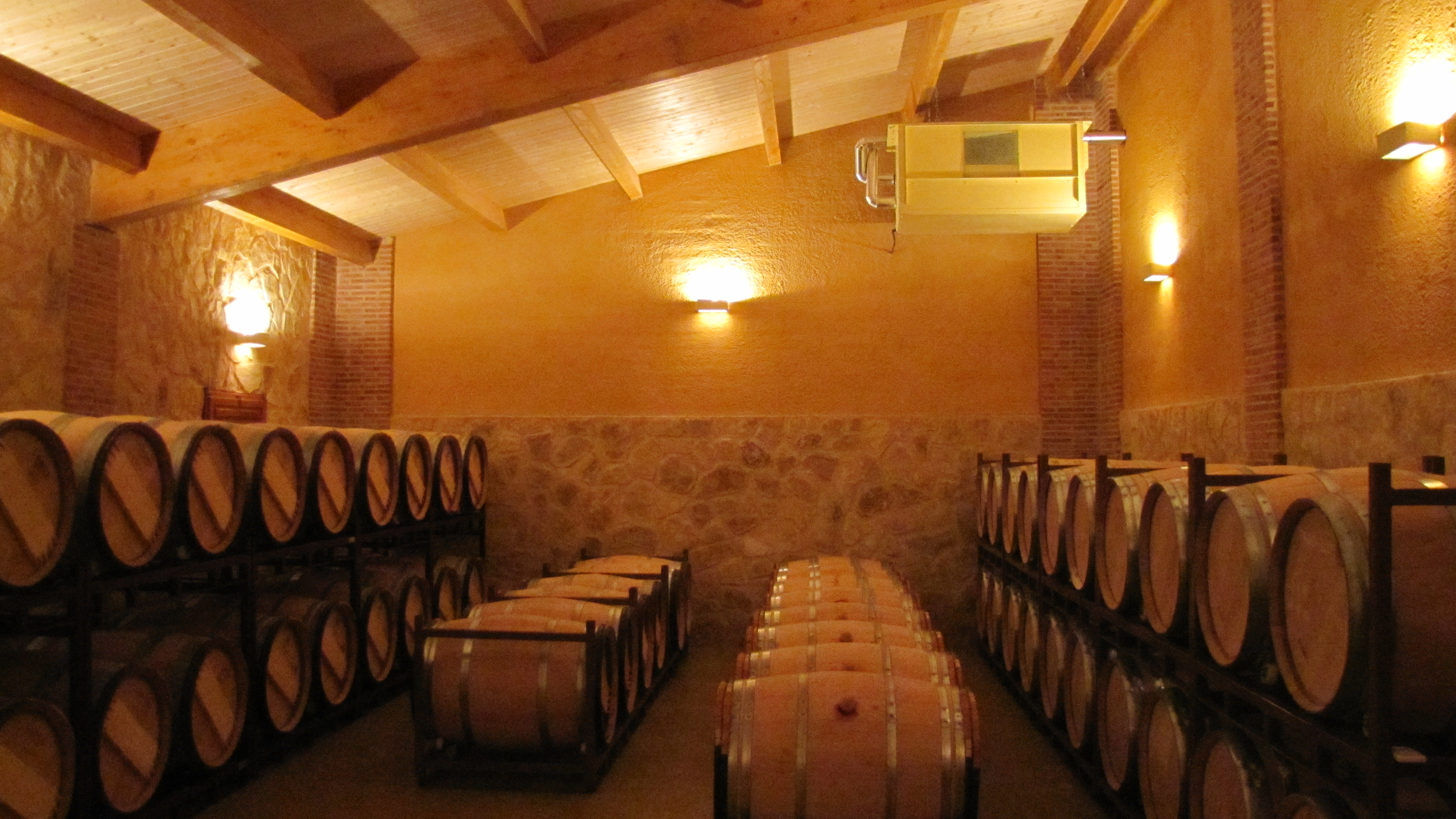
Hermanos Sastre wine cellar

Although an inland province, fish is commonly consumed, some brought from the Cantabrian Sea. Fish like red bream and hake are a major part of Valladolid's cuisine.

The main speciality of Valladolid is, however, lechazo (suckling baby lamb). The lechazo is slowly roasted in a wood oven and served with salad.

Valladolid also offers a great assortment of wild mushrooms. Asparagus, endive and beans can also be found. Some legumes, like white beans and lentils are particularly good. Pine nuts are also produced in great quantities.

Sheep cheese from Villalón de Campos, the famous pata de mulo (mule's foot) is usually unripened (fresh), but can cured the ripening process to bring out a different flavor.

Valladolid has a bread to go with every dish, like the cuadros from Medina del Campo, the muffins, the pork-scratching bread and the lechuguinos, with a pattern of concentric circles that resemble a head of lettuce.

The pastries and baked goods from the province of Valladolid are well-known, specially St. Mary's ring-shaped pastries, St. Claire's sponge cakes, pine nut balls and cream fritters.

Valladolid is also a producer of wines. The ones that fall under the Designation of Origin Cigales are very good. White wines from Rueda and red wines from Ribera del Duero are known for their quality.

== Sports ==
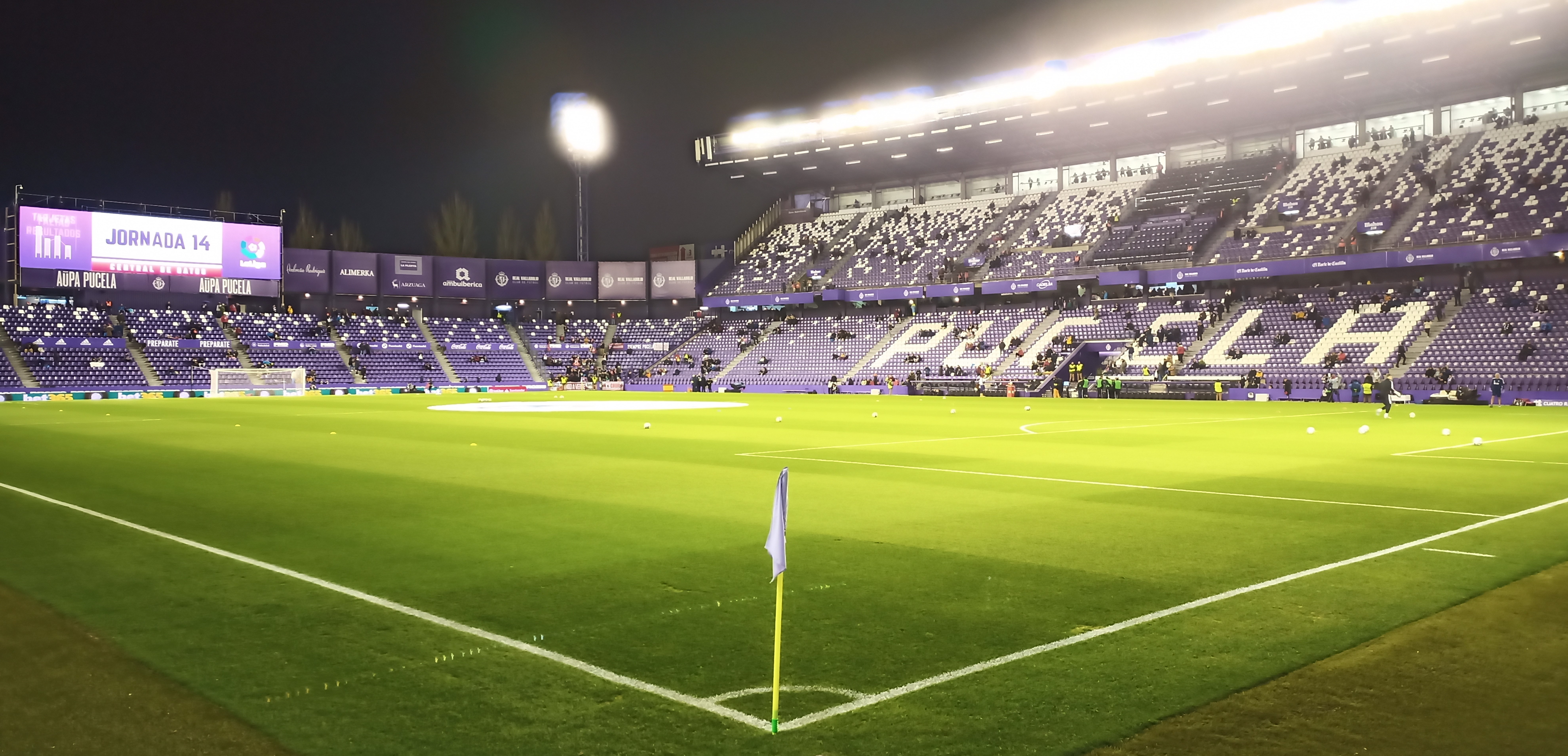
The José Zorrilla Stadium, home of Real Valladolid

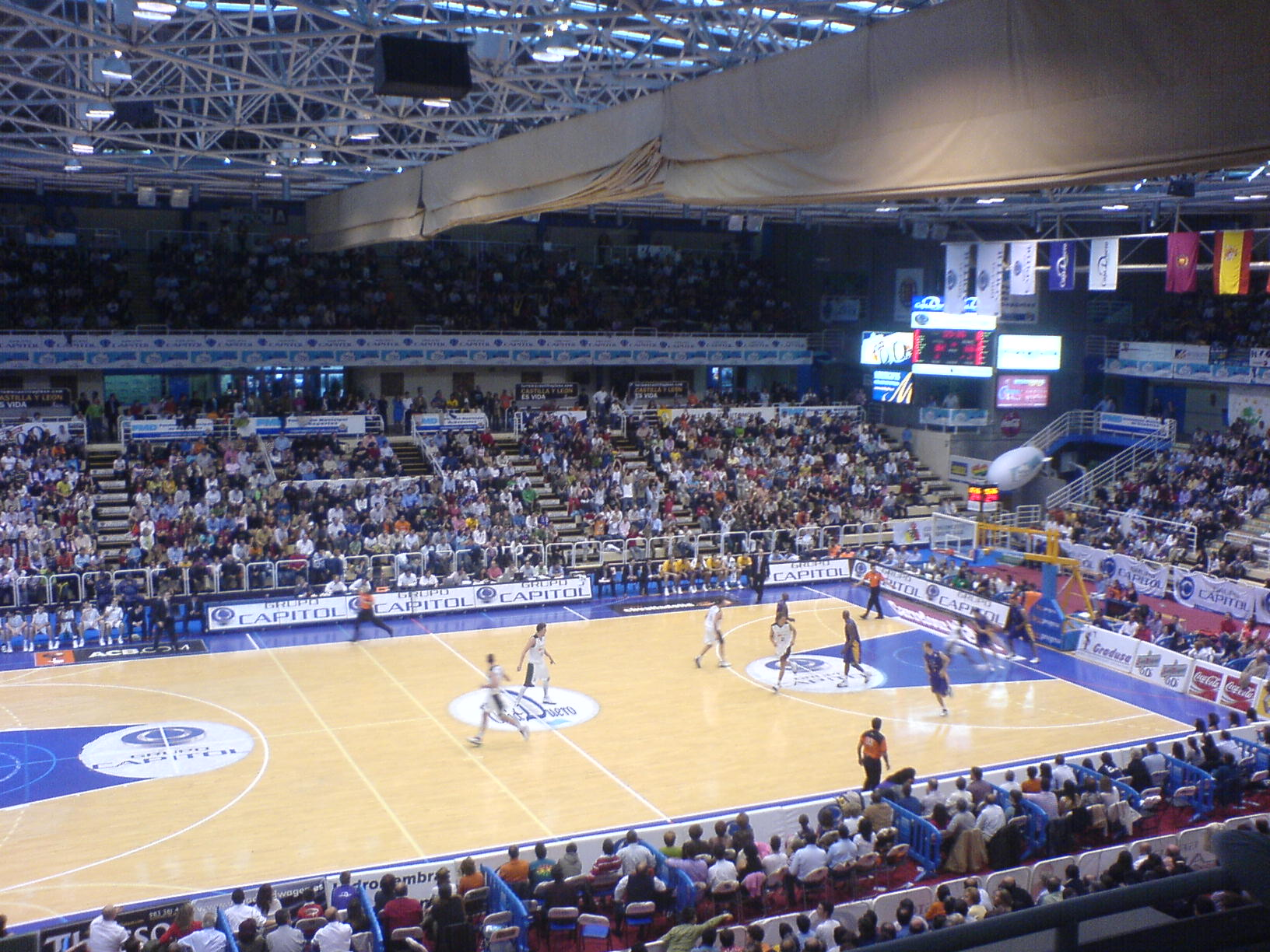
The Pabellón Polideportivo Pisuerga, home of CBC Valladolid

Valladolid's main association football club is Real Valladolid, nicknamed Pucela, who play in the country's second-tier league, LaLiga Hypermotion. Players who went on to play for the Spain national football team include Fernando Hierro, José Luis Caminero and Rubén Baraja. The municipally owned stadium where Real Valladolid play their home matches, the Estadio Nuevo José Zorrilla, was built as a venue for the 1982 FIFA World Cup and in preparation staged the 1982 Copa del Rey Final.

CB Ciudad de Valladolid is the city's new basketball team since the dissolution of CB Valladolid in 2015. Arvydas Sabonis and Oscar Schmidt played for the latter team. Currently playing in the Segunda FEB, the CBC Valladolid matches are held at the Polideportivo Pisuerga. Sergio de Larrea is the first Valladolid native to play in the NBA.

In handball Valladolid was represented by BM Valladolid of the Liga ASOBAL. They won 2 King's Cup, 1 ASOBAL Cup and 1 EHF Cup Winners' Cup. After the disappearance of this club, BM Atlético Valladolid was born, which also competes in the Liga ASOBAL. They play their games at the Polideportivo Huerta del Rey.

Rugby union is a very popular sport in Valladolid. VRAC and CR El Salvador, with 39 and 28 titles respectively, have dominated Spanish rugby for the last decades. They play their matches at Estadio Pepe Rojo.

The Plaza de toros de Valladolid, a bullring, opened on 29 September 1890, and it has a capacity of 11,000.

== International relations ==
=== Twin towns – sister cities ===
Valladolid is twinned with:

- Florence, Italy (2007)
- Lecce, Italy (2009)
- Lille, France (1987)
- Morelia, Michoacán, Mexico (1978) (Note: Morelia had been named Valladolid before Mexican independence in 1820; it was renamed in 1828 after the independence leader José María Morelos, born in the city in 1765.)
- Orlando, Florida, United States (2006)

=== Other partnerships ===
Valladolid cooperates with:

- Ahmedabad, Gujarat, India
- Boston, Massachusetts, United States
- Guadalajara, Jalisco, Mexico
- Kenitra, Morocco
- Lovech, Bulgaria (2004)

== Notable people ==
- Anne of Austria (1601–1666), queen of France
- Miriam Blasco (born 1963), judoka
- María Mercedes Capa Estrada (born 1970), goalball athlete
- Francis Ferdinand de Capillas (1607–1648), protomartyr saint of China
- José Manuel Capuletti (1925–1978), painter
- Miguel Delibes (1920–2010), writer
- Justo Garrán Moso (1867–1942), Traditionalist politician
- Henry IV of Castile (1425–1474), king of Castile and León, brother of Isabella I of Castile
- Cecilia del Nacimiento (1570–1646), nun, mystic, writer, and poet
- Aodh Ruadh Ó Domhnaill, also known as Red Hugh O'Donnell (1572–1602), Irish Gaelic chieftain, buried here
- Philip II of Spain (1527–1598), king of Spain and Portugal, and jure uxoris king of England and Ireland
- Philip IV of Spain (1605–1665), king of Spain and Portugal
- Roldán Rodríguez (born 1984), racing driver
- Sancho the Brave (1258–1295), king of Castile
- Juan de Torquemada (1388–1468), bishop and cardinal
- Juan de Valladolid (1420-?), converso poet and astrologer
- José Luis Rodríguez Zapatero (born 1960), Spanish prime minister
- José Zorrilla (1817–1893), writer
- Jesús Cifuentes (born 1966), singer, songwriter and member of the folk rock band Celtas Cortos.
- Alberto García (born 1970), musician and member of Celtas Cortos.
- Carlos Soto (born 1968), musician and founding member of Celtas Cortos.
- Goyo Yeves (born 1968), musician and founding member of Celtas Cortos.
- Pilar Mateos (born 1942), writer of children's literature.
- Óscar Puente (born 1968), politician and former mayor of Valladolid.
- Concha Velasco (1939–2023), actress, singer and television presenter.
- Iván Nabalón, Spanish technology entrepreneur and co-founder of Electronic ID.
- Ana Redondo García (born 1966), politician and university professor.

== See also ==
- English College, Valladolid
