= Wyndham Park =

Planned village in Peterston-super-Ely, Wales

Coordinates: 51.476°N 3.319°W

Wydham Park (originally known as Glyn Cory Garden Village) is an uncompleted planned village in Peterston-super-Ely in the Vale of Glamorgan. It was the first garden suburb in Wales.

The development was funded by the coal industry magnate and ship owner John Cory. Cory resided at his nearby estate, Dyffryn House, in the village of Dyffryn. After Cory's death in 1910 the development of Glyn Cory Garden Village was led by his son, Reginald. Cory left £10,000 (equivalent to £1,289,000 in 2023) for the completion of Glyn Cory in his will. The 1913 edition of Ewart Culpin's book The Garden City Movement Up-To-Date describes the planned 300 acre site of Glyn Cory Garden Village as consisting of 1400 houses over 140 acres of residential land with an 80-acre golf course, and 60 acres for small holdings and allotments. The houses were available on leases of 99 or 999 years at a cost which was a quarter of similarly developed land in the city of Cardiff, some 7 miles away.

It was planned by Thomas Adams in collaboration with the landscape and garden designer Thomas Hayton Mawson. Only 22 houses had been completed of the original plan by 1914. The original plan involved the creation of a church with hundreds of houses and several public buildings on a 300-acre site. The site was intended to be laid out over "a grand amphitheatre of concentric roads with radial avenues".

The land agent of the scheme was W. R. Jackson. Sales particulars were first made available in 1909. The Welshman wrote in October 1909 that "The problem of housing must be solved in the suburbs of our towns rather than in the centres" and that the creation of Glyn Cory was "a step towards the solving of this problem" and arose "from a desire on the part of the owner and his family to make healthy housing conditions possible by providing an example of town planning on a rural area which is still unspoiled by the encroachment of ordinary suburban development".

1–10 Pwll-y-Min Crescent in Wydham Park are listed Grade II by Cadw. The heritage listing for 1–10 Pwll-y-Min Crescent describes the reason or their listing as for their "architectural interest as part of a most unusual crescent of early C20 houses" and for their "strikingly original design". The architect of Nos. 1–10 is unknown, with Thomas Adams and Baillie Scott being probable candidates.
