= Covaresa =

Neighborhood of Valladolid, Spain

Coordinates: 41°36′38″N 4°45′02″W

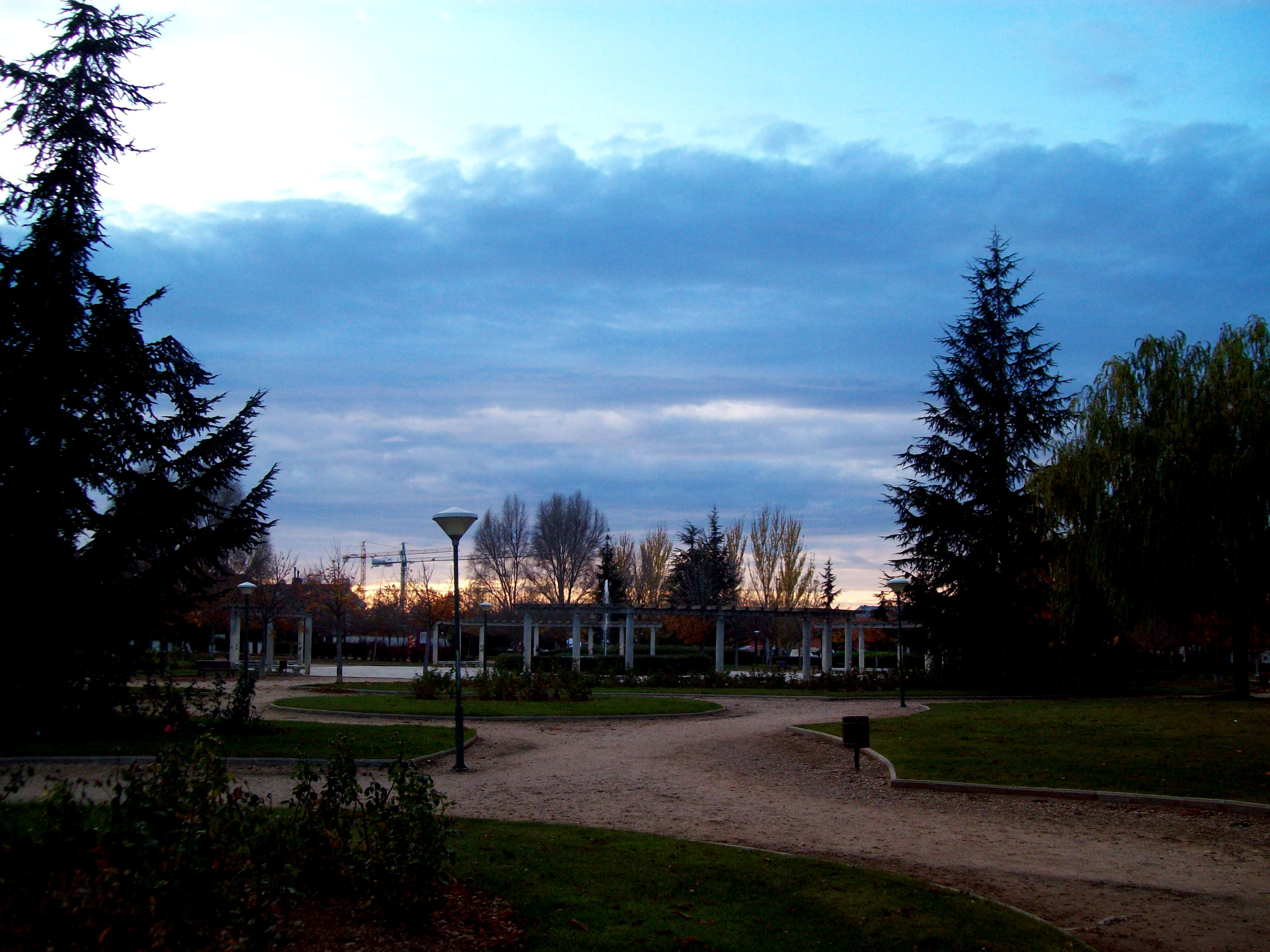
The park that separates Covaresa from the next neighbourhood, Parque Alameda

Covaresa is a neighborhood of Valladolid, located at the south of the city, with a population of about 8,700. It is bordered by railways to the east, Paula López and Parque Alameda to the north, El Peral to the west, and the South External Round of Valladolid. It was developed in the 1980s and it was not completed until nearly 2008, being one of the youngest zones in the city.

== History ==
Some builders of the city who compounded the "Industrial Cooperative of Valladolid Construction" set the idea: a new neighbourhood following the models of the Garden city movement and provide ground as cheap as possible. To move forward they create a society called in Spain "Constructores Vallisoletanos Reunidos S.A.". That's the origin of the zone name. They choose the current location, in the south of the city, because the low number of owners would make easier the development.

200 hectares were bought and the first estimations include 47.300 inhabitants, around 61 houses per hectare, and a density of 273 inhabitants per hectare. Few hectares among the 200 acquired belong to the Asuncion College, owned by a group of nuns who wanted to retain it and to enable it to serve the new neighborhood as a church. Finally the nuns rejected the College and the Society COVARESA installed there its headquarters. In 1983 the Junta of Castile and León was formed and some voices purposed the Asuncion College as a headquarters for the new administration. In October 1983 the Society COVARESA give the building to the Junta of Castile and León. Another idea was seize the wooded zones surrounding some irrigation canals. Although the "green aparience" of the development, some groups and associations claim that the wooded zone of "Pinar de Antequera" was in danger because this expansion to the south.

The difficulties to start the works and the doubts about the huge size of the project make the Society reconsider some aspects, reducing from 200 hectares to 70 hectares. At last, between 1988 and 1989 the zone was urbanized: streets, paths, pipeline, electrification,... The construction companies acquired parcels and designed the publicity, crowding the local radios and newspapers.

A problem promptly noticed by the developers was the lack of public ground on which to locate services as schools, sport or commercial equipment,... What had space was a church, opened by the Valladolid Bishop in 1991. Newsagents, supermarkets, and other commercial services began to be opened soon. A neighbour association was created to remind of the problems that the zone suffers, based on the lack of equipment.

== Transport ==
It is connected to the centre city by bus. Three lines, two of them with a frequency of about ten minutes link the neighborhood with main malls, bus and rail station, and other important places of Valladolid, such as Paseo Zorrilla – a highly commercial avenue – or some colleges of Universidad de Valladolid.
