= Arroyo de la Encomienda =

Coordinates: 41°37′31″N 4°46′17″W

Arroyo de la Encomienda, Spain
- Flag Coat of arms

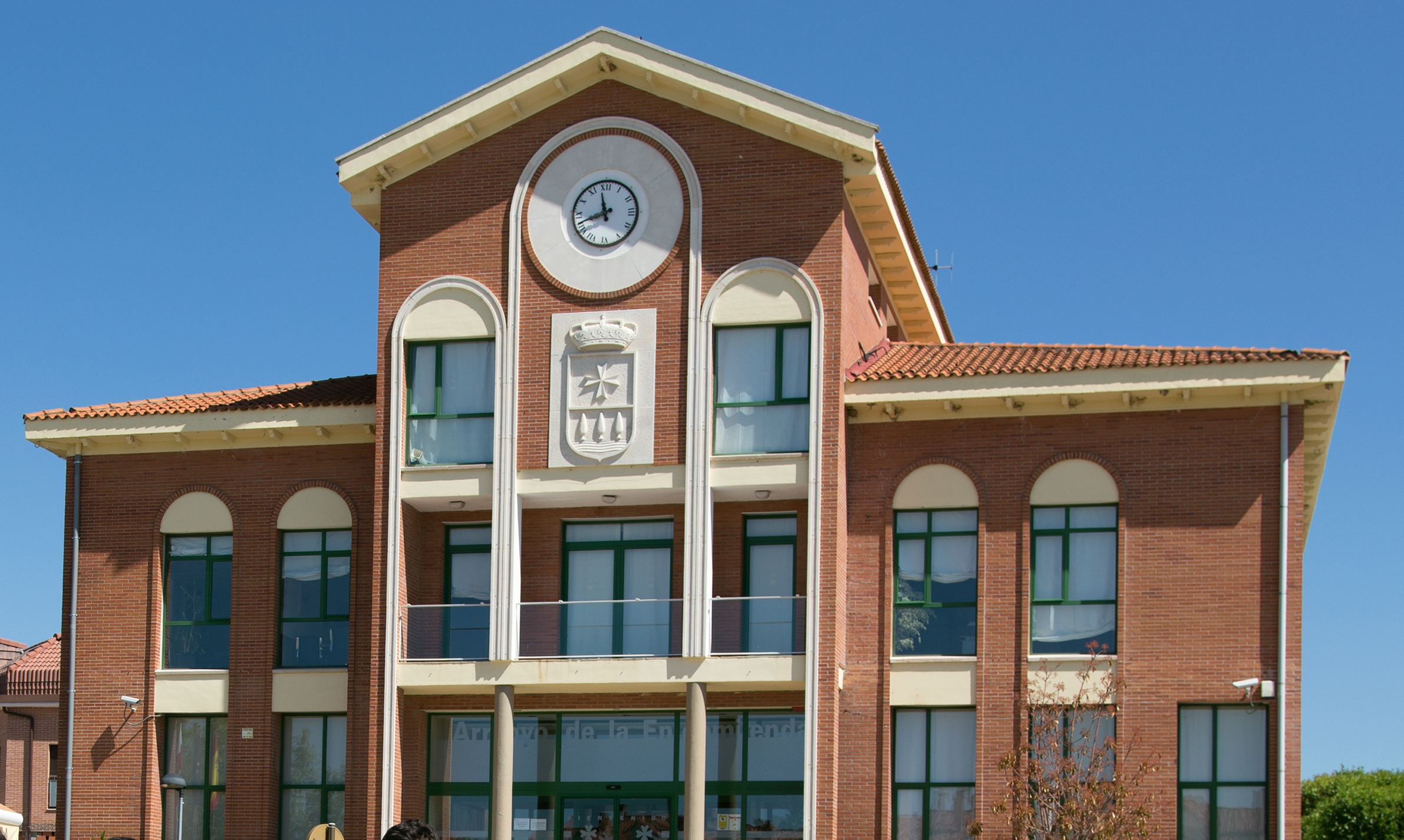
- town hall
- Country: Spain
- Autonomous community: Castile and León
- Province: Valladolid
- Municipality: Arroyo de la Encomienda

Area
  - Total: 11.54 km^{2} (4.46 sq mi)
- Elevation: 690 m (2,260 ft)

Population (2026)
  - Total: 23,304
  - Density: 2,019/km^{2} (5,230/sq mi)
- Time zone: UTC+1 (CET)
  - Summer (DST): UTC+2 (CEST)
- Website: Town Hall of Arroyo de la Encomienda

Arroyo de la Encomienda is a municipality located in the province of Valladolid, Castile and León, Spain. According to the 2015 census (INE), the municipality has a population of 18491 inhabitants.

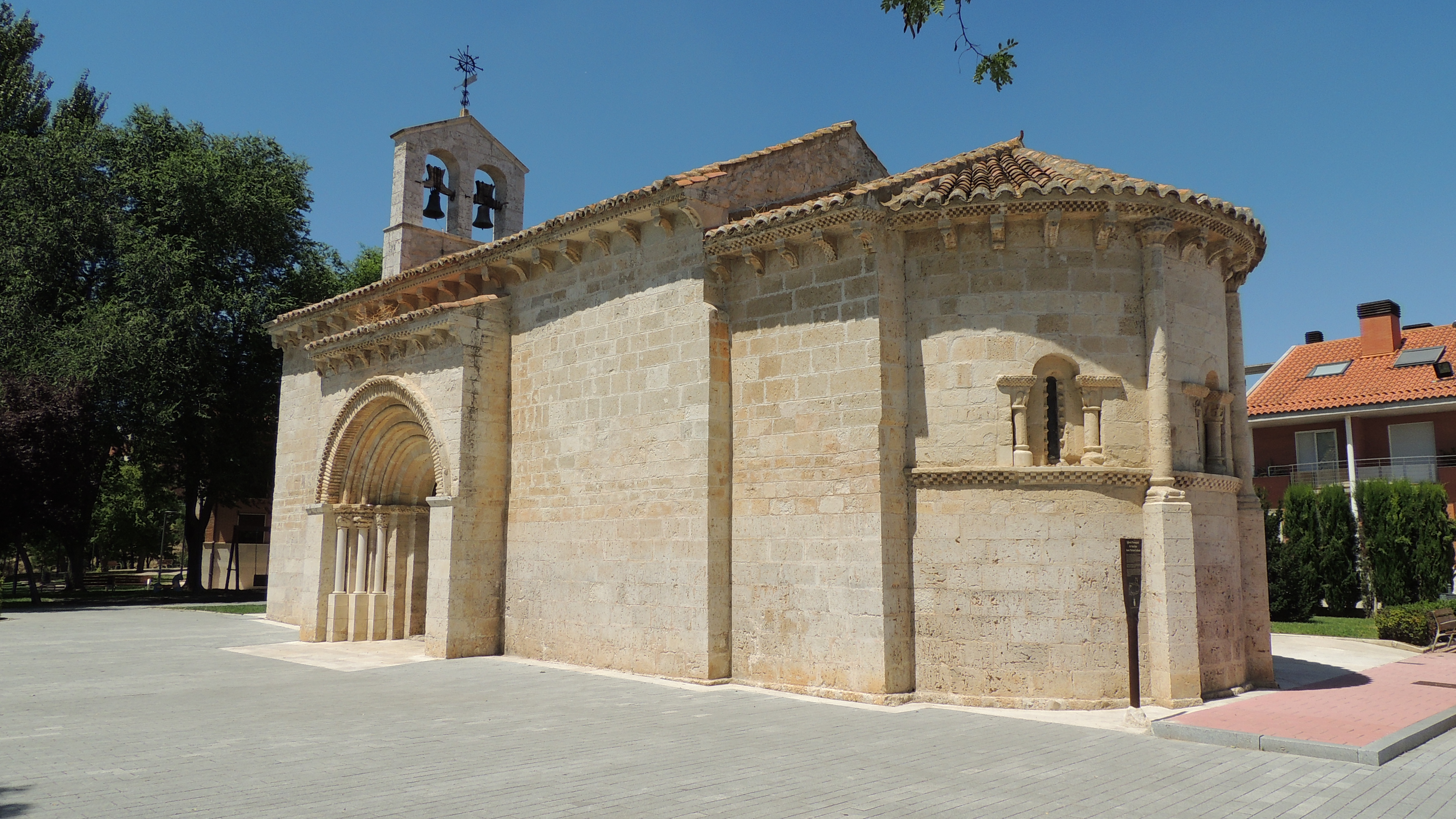
Church San Juan Evangelista, 12th century.

== See also ==
- Cuisine of the province of Valladolid
