= List of Spanish dishes =

This is a list of dishes found in Spanish cuisine.

== Spanish dishes ==
Name	Image	Region	Type	Description
Arroz a la cubana ("Cuban-style rice")		Canary Islands	rice dish	a dish consisting of rice, a fried egg, a fried banana and tomato sauce.
Arròs negre/arroz negro or paella negra ("black rice", "black paella")		Valencian Community and Catalonia	rice dish	a cuttlefish (or squid) and rice dish very similar to seafood paella. It is made with cephalopod ink, cuttlefish or squid, rice, garlic, green cubanelle peppers, sweet paprika, olive oil and seafood broth.
Boquerones en vinagre		everywhere	fish dish	Anchovies marinated in vinegar and seasoned with garlic and parsley
Butifarra amb mongetes		Catalonia	bean dish	a dish consisting of a cooked botifarra and dry beans.
Calamares en su tinta		everywhere	fish dish	calamari cooked in their own ink, often served with rice
Callos a la madrileña		Madrid	meat dish	an offal (tripe) dish
Carcamusas		Province of Toledo	meat dish	a dish consisting of cooked lean meat and season vegetables.
Chicharrón (Beef Scratchings)		Andalusia	pork dish	a dish made of fried pork rinds. It is sometimes made from chicken, mutton, or beef.
Chireta, gireta or girella		Aragonese and Catalan Pyrenees	pudding	a type of haggis with rice made in some Pyrenean regions.
Cuchifritos or cochifritos		Castilla-La Mancha, Castilla y León and Extremadura	meat dish	a fried lamb or goat meat along with olive oil, garlic, vinegar, basil, rosemary, bay leaves, and spearmint.
Escabeche		everywhere	fish dish	referring to both a dish of poached or fried fish, and not only fish (escabeche of chicken, rabbit or pork is common in Spain) that is marinated in an acidic mixture before serving, and to the marinade itself.
Escalivada		Catalonia	salad	a salad that consists of several types of grilled vegetables, such as eggplants, spicy red peppers, red tomato and sweet onions. Once well cooked on the grill, those vegetables are peeled or sliced in strips, the seeds removed, and seasoned with olive oil and salt, and sometimes with garlic as well.
Esqueixada		Catalonia	salad	a salad that consists of shredded salt cod, tomatoes, onions, olive oil and vinegar, salt, and sometimes a garnish of olives or hard-boiled eggs.
Fideuà or Fideuada		Valencian Community	noodle dish	a noodle dish with a similar recipe to paella, usually made with seafood and fish, and optionally served with alioli sauce (garlic and olive oil sauce).
Gachas ("porridge")		Andalusia	staple dish	an ancestral basic dish from central and southern Spain. Its main ingredients are flour, water, olive oil, garlic and salt.
Gambas al ajillo		everywhere	seafood	peeled shrimps cooked in a clay casserole with oil and garlic
Gazpacho manchego		Castilla-La Mancha	staple dish	pieces of torta de Gazpacho, also known as tight candles, a type of flat bread, mixed with a quail, pigeon, hare or rabbit stew.
Huevos rotos ("broken eggs")		everywhere	egg dish	fried eggs accompanied by French fries and some kind of meat (ham, bacon or a sausage like chorizo, longaniza or chistorra).
Migas ("crumbs")		Castilla–La Mancha, Andalusia, Aragon, Murcia, Castile and León, Extremadura	bread dish	small toasted pieces of bread (crumbs) with olive oil, garlic and bacon, mainly.
Paella		Valencia	rice dish	a saffron rice dish traditionally made with chicken, rabbit, and butter beans (Paella Valenciana).
Patatas bravas ("fierce potatoes")		Everywhere	potato dish	cube-shaped fries with salsa brava, a spicy sauce.
Patatas revolconas		Castile and León	potato dish	mashed potatoes with paprika, often accompanied by torreznos
Ropa vieja ("old clothes")		Canary Islands	meat dish	shredded flank steak in a tomato sauce base
Tortilla de patata (Spanish tortilla, "potatoe omelette")		everywhere	egg dish	an omelette with potatoes and onion (optionally without it), often served as a tapa.
Zarangollo		Region of Murcia	egg dish	a Murcian dish consisting of scrambled eggs with zucchini, onion, and occasionally potatoes.

== Breads and pastries ==
Name	Image	Region	Type	Description
Pincho or pintxo ("thorn", "spike")		Everywhere. Quite famous in Basque Country	appetizer	a small slice of bread upon which an ingredient or mixture of ingredients is put and held there using a stick. The common ingredients are fish such as hake, cod, anchovy, and baby eels; tortilla de patatas; stuffed peppers; and croquettes.
Pa amb tomàquet		Catalonia	bread	bread with tomato
Coca		Catalonia, Aragon, Valencian Community and Balearic Islands	pie or pastry	a savory or sweet pastry with toppings. Savory coca could be considered a twin sister to the Italian pizza
Empanada gallega		Galicia	pie or pastry	a savoury pie (similar to pasties) stuffed with sofrito and minced meat or fish like tuna.
Hornazo		Castile and León	pie or bread	a meat pie or bread made with flour and yeast and stuffed with pork loin, spicy chorizo sausage and hard-boiled eggs. In Salamanca, it is traditionally eaten in the field during the "Monday of the Waters" (Lunes de Aguas) festival.
Mollete		Andalusia	bread	a kind of bread
Talo		Basque	bread	a Basque fried bread from the Pyrenees. It is made with regular wheat flour, water, oil or fat, salt and yeast. They are traditionally served with a fried egg.

== Soups and stews ==
Name	Image	Region	Type	Description
Ajoblanco		Granada and Málaga (Andalusia)	cold soup	a cold soup made of bread, crushed almonds, garlic, water, olive oil, salt and sometimes vinegar. It is usually served with grapes or slices of melon.
Cocido; Cocidos		Castilla y León and Madrid	stew	a traditional chickpea-based stew from Madrid, Spain made with vegetables, potatoes and meat
Escudella		Catalonia	stew	a dense soup with big pasta
Caparrones		La Rioja	stew	a bean and sausage stew
Fabada Asturiana		Asturias	stew	a rich bean stew
Gazpacho		Andalusia	cold soup	a cold soup made with raw tomato, cucumber, pepper, onion and some garlic, olive oil, wine vinegar, water, and salt. Typically drunk in summer.
Marmitako; Marmita or Sorropotún		Basque and Cantabria	stew	a dish with tuna, potatoes, onions, pimientos, and tomatoes.
Patatas con costillas adobadas		Province of Ávila	stew	a dish with potatoes and marinated pork chops
Olla podrida		Castilla y León and Extremadura	stew	a Spanish stew made from pork and beans and other meats and vegetables
Ollada or perolada		Catalonia and Valencian Community	stew	boiling vegetables and meat in a casserole
Pipérade		Basque	a main or a side dish	a Basque dish typically prepared with onion, green peppers, and tomatoes sautéd in olive oil and flavored with Espelette pepper.
Pisto; Pisto manchego		Castilla-La Mancha	stew	a dish made of tomatoes, onions, eggplant or courgettes, green and red peppers and olive oil. It is similar to ratatouille and is usually served warm to accompany a dish or with a fried egg and bread. It is also used as the filling for empanadillas and empanadas.
Salmorejo		Andalusia	cold soup	A thick cold soup based on tomato, bread, olive oil and garlic, originating in Córdoba (Andalusia). It is garnished with diced Spanish Serrano ham and diced hard-boiled eggs.

== Condiments and sauces ==
Name	Image	Region	Type	Description
Allioli		Mediterranean Provinces	sauce	a sauce which is made (and literally means) garlic and [olive] oil. Typically eaten with fish dishes (especially Fideua or Arroz a Banda).
Almogrote		Canary Islands	paste	a soft paste made from hard cheese, peppers, olive oil, garlic, and other ingredients, which is typically eaten spread on toast.
Mojo (sauce)		Canary Islands	sauce	several types of hot sauce that originated in the Canary Islands.
Palm syrup		Canary Islands		
Paprika		everywhere	spice	a spice made from the grinding of many dried sweet red or green bell peppers
Piquillo pepper		Navarre	chili	a variety of chili traditionally grown in Navarre, over the town of Lodosa.
Romesco		Catalonia	sauce	a sauce made from almonds or hazelnuts, roasted garlic, olive oil and nyores - small, dried red peppers.
Salsa brava		everywhere	sauce	spicy sauce used with "patatas bravas"
Sherry vinegar		Andalusia	vinegar	a gourmet wine vinegar made from Sherry.
Sofrito		everywhere	sauce	a well cooked and fragrant sauce consisted of garlic, onions, and tomatoes cooked in olive oil and is used as the base for many dishes.
Tomate frito		everywhere	sauce	a pureed tomato sauce with a hint of onion and garlic, that can be used as a base ingredient or enjoyed simply for its own flavor. Pictured is seitan with tomate frito
Xató		Catalonia	sauce	a sauce made with almonds, hazelnuts, breadcrumbs, vinegar, garlic, olive oil, salt, and the nyora pepper. Xató is often served with an endive salad prepared with anchovy, tuna and baccala.

== Desserts ==
Name	Image	Region	Type	Description
Alfajores		Andalusia	dessert	a Christmas pastry (very different from Latin American alfajores)
Catànies		Catalonia	confectionery	Catalan marcona almonds covered with white chocolate and powdered black chocolate to be eaten with the coffee.
Churros		everywhere	breakfast and snack	fried-dough pastry-based sticks served as snacks or breakfast with hot chocolate.
Flan (crème caramel or caramel custard)		everywhere	pudding	a rich custard dessert with a layer of soft caramel on top, as opposed to crème brûlée, which is custard with a hard caramel top.
Crema catalana (Catalan crème brûlée)		Catalonia	dessert	a dessert consisting of a rich custard base topped with a layer of hard caramel, created by caramelizing sugar under a broiler, with a blowtorch or other intense heat source, or by pouring cooked caramel on top of the custard. It is usually served cold in individual ramekins.
Frangollo		Canary Islands	dessert	a dessert made from milk, millet or maize flour, lemon, eggs, sugar, butter, raisins, almonds, and cinnamon. Many variations exist: the milk may be replaced by water, aniseed may be added
Galleta María(Marie biscuit)		everywhere	biscuit	a type of sweet biscuit similar to a Rich Tea biscuit. It is made with wheat flour, sugar, vegetable oil and vanilla flavoring
Mazapán (Marzipan)		Toledo and Soto en Cameros	confection	a confection consisting primarily of sugar and almond meal.
Natillas		everywhere	custard	A custard dish made with milk and eggs typically made with milk, sugar, vanilla, eggs, and cinnamon
Panellets		Catalonia	small cakes or cookies	traditional dessert of the All Saints holiday in the Catalan Countries, together with chestnuts, sweet potatoes or sweet wine. Panellets (Catalan for little breads) are small cakes or cookies in different shapes, mostly round, made mainly of marzipan.
Polvorón		everywhere	bread	a type of Andalusian shortbread of Levantine origin that is made of flour, sugar, pig fat, almonds and cinnamon.
Dulce de membrillo (quince paste)		everywhere	jelly	a sweet, thick, quince jelly or quince candy.
Tarta de Santiago (cake of St. James)		Galicia, Mondoñedo	pie	almond pie fillied with ground almonds, eggs and sugar. The top of the pie is usually decorated with powdered sugar, masked by an imprint of the Saint James cross.
Teja			confectionery	a popular dumpling-shaped confection that contains manjar blanco filling (similar to dulce de leche) and either dry fruits or nuts.
Tortas de aceite ("oil flatbread")		everywhere	bread	a light, crispy and flaky sweet flatbread.
Tortell		Catalonia	pastry	a Catalan typically O-shaped pastry stuffed with marzipan, that on some special occasions is topped with glazed fruit.
Turrón torró, or torrone		Valencian Community	confection	a nougat confection, typically made of honey, sugar, and egg white, with toasted almonds or other nuts, and usually shaped into either a rectangular tablet or a round cake.

=== Dairy products ===
Spanish cheeses

Name	Image	Region	Type	Description
Afuega'l pitu		Asturias	cheese	An unpasteurised cow's milk cheese
Quesu Cabrales		Asturias	cheese	A very strong blue cheese made by rural dairy farmers in Asturias from pure, unpasteurised cow's milk or blended with goat or sheep milk, which gives the cheese a stronger, more spicy flavor. The milk must come from herds raised in the region of Picos de Europa.
Cuajada		Northern Spain	curd	A cheese-like product (milk curd), made traditionally from ewe's milk, but industrially and more often today from cow's milk. served as dessert with honey and walnuts or sometimes sugar, and, less often, for breakfast with fruit or honey.
Idiazábal cheese		Basque	cheese	A pressed cheese made from unpasteurized sheep milk that usually comes from the Lacha and Carranzana breeds in the Basque Country and Navarre (Spain).
Garrotxa cheese		Catalonia	cheese	A pressed cheese made from unpasteurized goat's milk. It has a firm but creamy white interior, with a natural mold rind.
Manchego cheese		Castilla la Mancha	cheese	Cheese made from milk of sheep of the Manchega breed, which is aged between 60 days and two years. Manchego has a firm and compact consistency and a buttery texture, and often contains small, unevenly distributed air pockets.
Mató cheese		Catalonia	cheese	A Catalan fresh cheese made from cows' or goats' milk, with no salt added, similar to Caleb Yoon, ricotta or curd cheese. It is usually served with honey, as a dessert. The mató from Montserrat mountain is famous.
Picón Bejes-Tresviso		Cantabria	cheese	A blue cheese from Cantabria
Torta del Casar		Extremadura	cheese	An artisan cheese made from milk of Merino and Entrefina sheep in the Extremadura region. It is yellowish, spreadable, creamy and intense.
Zamorano cheese		Castilla y León	cheese	A sheep's milk cheese made in the province of Zamora typically aged for at least six months. It is a hard, pale-yellow cheese with an intense buttery and nutty taste and crumbly texture.

=== Processed meat and fish ===
Spanish sausages

Name	Image	Region	Type	Description
Morcilla; Black pudding, blood pudding		everywhere	sausage	a wide variety blood pudding. The best known and most widespread is "morcilla de Burgos" which mainly contains pork blood and fat, rice, onions, and salt.
Botifarra		Catalonia	sausage	a type of sausage and one of the most important dishes of the Catalan cuisine.
Botillo		Province of León	meat	is a dish of meat-stuffed pork intestine. It is a culinary specialty of El Bierzo, a northern county in the Spanish province of León.
Cecina		Castilian-Leonese cuisine Province of León	meat	meat that has been salted and dried by means of air, sun or smoke.
Chistorra		Navarre	sausage	A type of sausage from Navarre, Spain. It is made of minced pork, or a mixture of minced pork and beef. It is usually fried or grilled, and is a popular ingredient in tapas.
Chorizo; Chourizo, Chouriço, Xoriço		everywhere	sausage	several types of pork sausage originating from the Iberian Peninsula.
Cochinillo		Valladolid León (Castilla y León)	meat	a Spanish meat made from roast suckling pig. Very typical of Segovia.
Fuet		Catalonia	sausage	a Catalan thin, cured, dry sausage of pork meat in a pork gut. The most famous is made in the comarca (county) of Osona
Jamón		everywhere	ham	a cured ham from Spain. There are two primary types of jamón: Jamón Serrano and Jamón Ibérico
Jamón ibérico pata negra		everywhere	ham	a type of cured ham produced only in Spain. It is at least 75% black Iberian pig, the only breed of pig that naturally seeks and eats mainly acorns
Jamón serrano		everywhere	ham	a type of jamón generally served raw in thin slices, similar to the Italian prosciutto crudo.
Lacón Gallego		Galicia	ham	a dried ham
Lechazo		Valladolid (Castilla y León)	meat	a Spanish meat made from unweaned lambs (roast lechazo -lambs-). Very typical of Valladolid. Lechazo de Castilla y León.
Lomo embuchado		everywhere	meat	a cured meat made from a pork tenderloin. In its essentials, it is the same as Cecina, the Spanish air dried cured smoked Beef tenderloin
Longaniza		everywhere	sausage	a pork sausage (embutido) similar to a chorizo.
Mojama		Andalusia	seafood	filleted salt-cured tuna originating in Phoenicia. It is usually served in extremely thin slices with olive oil and chopped tomatoes or almonds.
Torreznos		everywhere	bacon	fried bacon snack

=== Others ===
Name	Image	Region	Type	Description
Common ling			fish	a large member of the cod family
Calçot		Catalonia	vegetable	a variety of scallion from Valls (Tarragona)
Gofio		Canary Islands	Wholemeal FLour	a stoneground flour made from roasted cereals (e.g. wheat, barley or bot fern, maize) and a little added salt.
Squid (food)			seafood	Squid

== Beverages ==
=== Alcoholic beverages ===
Spanish wine

Name	Image	Region	Type	Description
Aguardiente; Aguardente, augardente/caña or oruxu		Galicia	drink	alcoholic drinks between 29 and 60 percent alcohol made from a number of different sources. Fruit, grain, tuber, sugarcane or other sweet canes can be the main ingredients.
Brandy		Andalusia	drink	a brandy that is produced in Andalusia, Spain
Brandy de Jerez		Andalusia	brandy	a brandy that is produced only in the Jerez area of Andalusia, Spain
Herbero		Valencia	liquor	a liquor made in the Sierra de Mariola region. The plants used in the production of herbero include at least four of the following: sage, chamomile, pennyroyal, lemon verbena, the root of the blessed thistle, peppermint, cattail, fennel, anise, melissa, agrimony, savory, felty germander, thyme, and French lavender.
Irouléguy AOC wines		Basque	wine	
Izarra (liqueur)		Basque	liqueur	
Kalimotxo		Basque	drink	a drink consisting of approximately 50% red wine and 50% cola-based soft drink
Orujo		Galicia	liquor	a liquor obtained from the distillation of the pomace (solid remains left after pressing) of the grape. It is a transparent spirit with an alcohol content over 50% (100° proof).
Patxaran		Navarre	liqueur	a sloe-flavoured liqueur commonly drunk in Navarre and in the rest of Spain.
Ratafia		Catalonia	liqueur	liqueur flavored with lemon peel and spices in various amounts (nutmeg, cinnamon, clove, mint, rosemary, anise, etc.), typically combined with sugar.
Queimada		Galicia	drink	an alcoholic punch made from Galician aguardiente (Orujo Gallego) - a spirit distilled from wine and flavoured with special herbs or coffee, plus sugar, lemon peel, coffee beans and cinnamon.
Txakoli		Basque	wine	a fruity and dry white wine, usually served with "pintxos"
Zurracapote		everywhere	punch	a popular alcoholic mixed drink, similar to sangría. It consists of red wine mixed with fruit such as peaches and lemons, sugar, and cinnamon.
Sangria		everywhere	punch	Wine and fruit punch
Sidra		Asturias and Basque	drink	an alcoholic beverage made from apples

=== Non-alcoholic beverages ===
Name	Image	Region	Type	Description
Agua de cebada ("barley water")		Valencian Community, Region of Murcia	drink	refreshing drink made with malted barley, sugar and lemon.
Café bombón ("bonbon coffee")		everywhere	coffee	an espresso with condensed milk, served in a transparent glass to show its two layers.
Café con leche ("coffee with milk")		everywhere	coffee	a coffee beverage similar to the French café au lait and the Italian caffè e latte, In summer it is common to drink it cold in a glass with ice.
Horchata orxata		Valencian Community	drink	typical mediterranean beverage made of tigernuts (chufas), mixed with water and sugar.

== See also ==
- Merienda
- Andalusian cuisine
- Asturian cuisine
- Aragonese cuisine
- Balearic cuisine
- Basque cuisine
- Canarian cuisine
- Castilian-Leonese cuisine
- Cantabrian cuisine
- Castilian-Manchego cuisine
- Catalan cuisine
- Cuisine of the province of Valladolid
- Extremaduran cuisine
- Galician cuisine
- Leonese cuisine
- Valencian cuisine
- List of cuisines
- Denominación de origen
- List of Spanish soups and stews
- List of tapas
- List of Spanish cheeses
