= Extremaduran cuisine =

Cuisine of the Extremadura community of Spain

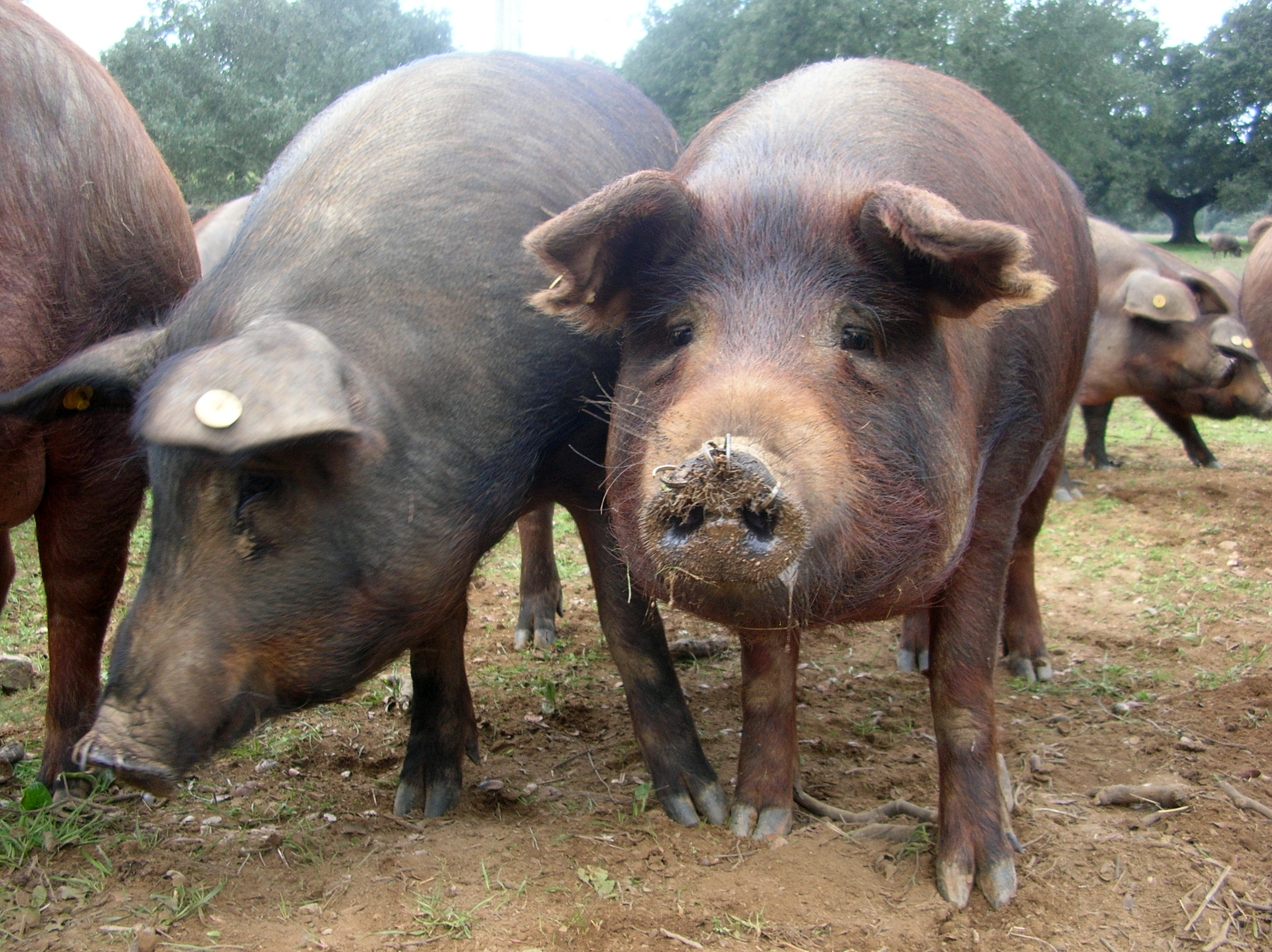
Iberian pigs live mostly in semi-wild conditions. The flesh of these pigs is essential in most Extremaduran dishes.

Extremadura, Spain is known for its different ways of preparing the Iberian pork and mutton. The main characteristics of the traditional Extremaduran cuisine are its simplicity, its lack of clutter and its low cost. It is also a cuisine reflecting a generous spirit, for many of its preparations used to be cooked in large pots to share with visitors, friends, and neighbors. The resulting dishes are eaten with local bread.

The preferred spices in Extremaduran cuisine are paprika (pimentón), garlic, bay leaves, pennyroyal, and anise. The Northeastern comarca of La Vera produces pimentón de la Vera, smoked paprika highly valued all over Spain and extensively used in Extremaduran cuisine. Olive oil is used for frying and as an ingredient in many dishes. Maybe due to Portuguese influence, some limited use of coriander leaves (unusual for other regions of mainland Spain outside the Canary Islands) can be found for some specific dishes such as repápalos or pickled cod (escabeche de bacalao), though often with the possibility of using parsley as an alternative and not with the same extensive use as in Portugal.

Wine is produced mainly in the territory of the Ribera del Guadiana denominación de origen. The region is also known for its vino de pitarra tradition, home-made wine made in small earthenware vessels.

The Jerte Valley is known for its cherry production, in the local picota del Jerte varieties, highly regarded all over Spain and with a denominación de origen.

== Representative dishes ==
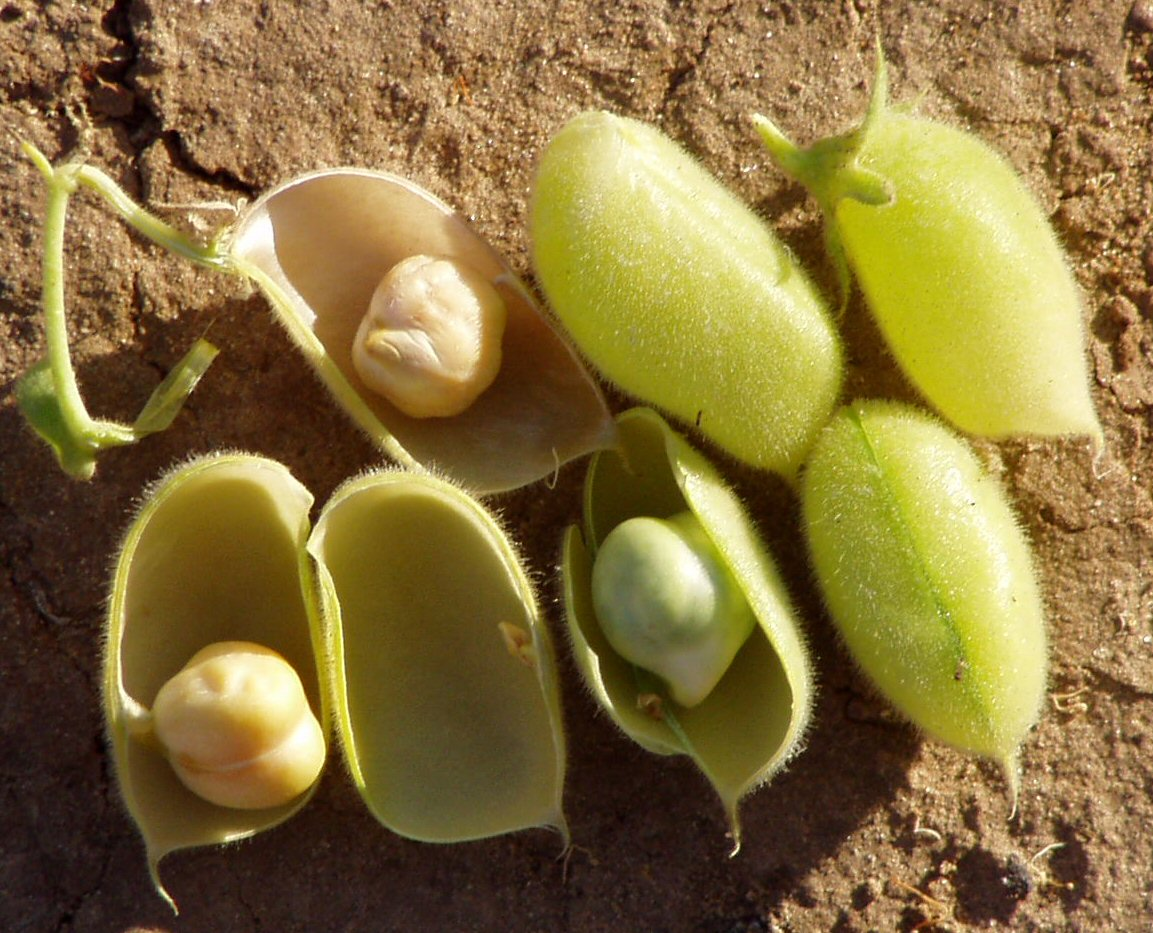
The chickpea is an important Extremaduran staple. Traditionally Extremaduran children loved to eat green chick peas straight out of the pods.

Among the pork or mutton-based dishes, some well-known ones are the callos con manos de cerdo (tripe with pig's feet), caldereta de cordero (mutton stew), cabrito en cuchifrito, frite de cordero (mutton fry) and the cabrito a la hortelana (kid and vegetable stew).

The chanfaina in Extremadura has nothing to do with similarly named dishes in the Iberian Peninsula, like the Catalan Xanfaina, which is a Spanish version of the Occitan Ratatouille, and which would be considered a kind of pisto in Extremadura. The Extremaduran chanfaina is a rich stew of mutton liver, brain, heart, and kidneys cooked with a mixture of bay leaves, garlic, bread crumbs and boiled eggs.

Traditional Extremaduran gastronomy includes other meats, like hen (gallina), which is one of the main ingredients of the emblematic cocido extremeño stew, arroz con liebre (rice with hare) and ancas de ranas fritas (fried frog legs). It also includes local fishes like tencas fritas (fried tench) and truchas con jamón (trout with ham), and even a certain large lizard usually prepared in guisado, made by frying slices of lizard in olive oil, after which they were stewed over a slow fire. In spite of being eaten in a variety of preparations and even served at restaurants in the past, also including entomatá de lagarto (lizard in tomato sauce) or lagarto en salsa verde (lizard in green sauce), currently lizards are a protected species and trapping them is prohibited.

Concerning fish, some cod preparations are known, and tench is among the most traditional freshwater fish, including fish and vegetable dishes such as moje de peces or escarapuche.

Among the basic popular dishes the ones based on chick peas are dominant. Other main ingredients are habichuelas (beans), potatoes, pumpkin, chestnuts, onions and bell peppers. Some famous dishes of Extremadura are cocido extremeño, potaje de garbanzos y judías blancas (chick pea and bean soup), sopa blanca de ajos (white garlic soup), potaje de castañas secas (chestnut soup), olla con asaura (a stew with offal and blood), and gazpacho extremeño (variants of gazpacho, sometimes with ham or pennyroyal mint).

Soups often have a stale bread base and include a variety of both hot and cold ones, such as sopa de ajo, sopa de tomate (bread-based soup with tomato, peppers and egg), sopa de poleo (pennyroyal mint soup), sopa de pan con aceitunas (bread soup with olives), sopa de espárragos trigueros (wild asparagus soup), sopa de antruejo (bread-based soup with a lot of pork), sopa de habas (broadbean soup) and others. It is traditional to eat such soups having figs at the same time as a side dish, or even grapes. Sopas canas include at least milk, bread and garlic as a base. Pennyroyal mint is sometimes used to season gazpachos or soups such as sopa de poleo. Extremaduran ajoblanco (ajoblanco extremeño) is a cold soup different from Andalusian ajoblanco since it contains egg yolk in the emulsion and it may contain vegetables such as tomatoes but no almonds.

Though rice is not as common as in some other Spanish regions, rice dishes with rabbit meat or pork are common, including arroz a la cacereña from Cáceres, which, after being cooked, is then covered in a crust of egg and cheese and then baked, in a way similar to Valencian arroz con costra.

Vegetables are found in many dishes, even if there is very little in the way of actual vegetarian dishes in the traditional cuisine. Still, apart from gazpachos, salads similar to Andalusian pipirrana (with a variety of local names such as picadillo, cojondongo or rinrán) are popular, as well as zorongollo, a salad made with tomato and roast peppers reminiscent of Catalan escalivada. As in La Mancha and Murcia, pisto is a traditional dish. Local tomato sauce is often known as tomatá or entomatá and it can be an accompaniment to many dishes.

Desert truffles, locally named criadillas or criadillas de tierra, are eaten with scrambled eggs (revuelto de criadillas), fried with other ingredients or as an accompaniment in other dishes. Even if many other mushroom species grow in Extremadura and they have some culinary use nowadays, only a few other mushroom species apart from desert truffles were actually traditionally consumed, such as Amanita ponderosa (called gurumelo, especially popular in Southern Extremadura), or Macrolepiota procera.

Some of the ancestral dishes of Extremadura are today less commonly eaten, like migas (such as migas con torreznos) and gachas. Vegetables like cardoon and borage were traditionally widely used in soups.

Certain dishes of the Extremaduran cuisine show the influence of neighboring Portugal, like lentejas estofadas (stewed lentils) and sopa de perdices (partridge soup).

== Embutidos and pork products ==
Extremadura's Black Iberian pigs are usually left to roam in relative freedom and their main diet are the acorns falling from the local oak trees. This breed of pig is found exclusively in Southwestern Iberia, both in Spain and Portugal. Their meat is highly valued throughout Spain, especially their ham.

Extremaduran cuisine is abundant in pork; it is said that the region is one of the best for breeding pigs in Spain, thanks to the acorns that grow in its dehesas.

Some Extremaduran embutidos (pork preserves and sausages) have a local flavor, like the morcilla «Felisa» (based on blood and onion), morcillas de cabezá (head innards morcillas), morcillas patateras (sausage containing mashed potato and pork fat and meat seasoned with paprika and garlic), as well as sausages prepared with pumpkin (morcilla de calabaza). Dry-cured pork products include chacinas and the local ham, longaniza, chorizo, salchichón, morcón and caña de lomo. Pork embutidos and other pieces of pork meat are often added to local stews, such as cocido.

Cachuela (sometimes also known as caldillo) is a fatty pork liver pâté seasoned with paprika, garlic and other spices.

Buche is a kind of embutido similar to Leonese botillo made from different pieces left over from the butchering of a pig, including the ribs, tail, and bones with a little meat left on them, which are chopped, seasoned and then stuffed into the cecum of the pig. Once cured, it is usually boiled and then opened to extract its content for consumption, usually as coles con buche, accompanied by other pork products and separate dishes of rice and cabbage cooked in the same broth produced by boiling the buche.

== Cheeses ==
The region is home to a variety of cheeses, those most well known being Torta del Casar, produced in Casar de Cáceres and surrounding area, and Torta de la Serena, produced in the comarca of la Serena. Both have a denominación de origen and both are sheep milk cheeses that are curdled using a coagulant found in the pistils of cardoon (Cynara cardunculus), which gives a creamy consistency and a rich taste with a light bitterness. These cheeses are traditionally eaten by slicing off the top and scooping out the inside with a spoon, then spreading it on bread. They're somewhat similar to Serra da Estrela cheese in Portugal.

Queso de los Ibores is another cheese with a denominación de origen, made in the comarcas of los Ibores, Villuercas, La Jara and Trujillo in the southeast of the Province of Cáceres. It is a fatty goat milk cheese made exclusively from the milk of Serrana, Verata, Retinta breeds and crosses between them and only from farms registered with the regulatory council.

A variety of goat milk cheeses found along the border with Portugal are similar to goat milk cheeses found in neighboring Portuguese areas and have a compact consistency and a strong taste and smell, such as Quesaílla cheese, as well as queso de Acehúche and queso de Gata-Hurdes.

== Desserts and sweets ==
Extremaduran desserts and sweets are mostly prepared using the local wheat flour, honey, pork fat, milk, sugar and olive oil. Some of them are buñuelos, magdalenas (anise-scented muffins), perrunillas, galletas, rosquillas de vino, roscas fritas (fried doughnuts), coquillos de miel, repápalos dulces, sopa de almendras (sweet almond soup), gañotes, hornazos dulces, roscas de muégado (or roscas de piñonate), hijuelas, gachas extremeñas (or puchas dulces), bollos fritos (fried buns), floretas, socochones hurdanos and jeringas . Some well known local specialties are tecula mecula from Olivenza, bollo turco from Jerez de los Caballeros, mormenteras from Alcántara and roscas de alfajor from Casar de Cáceres.
