= List of tapas =

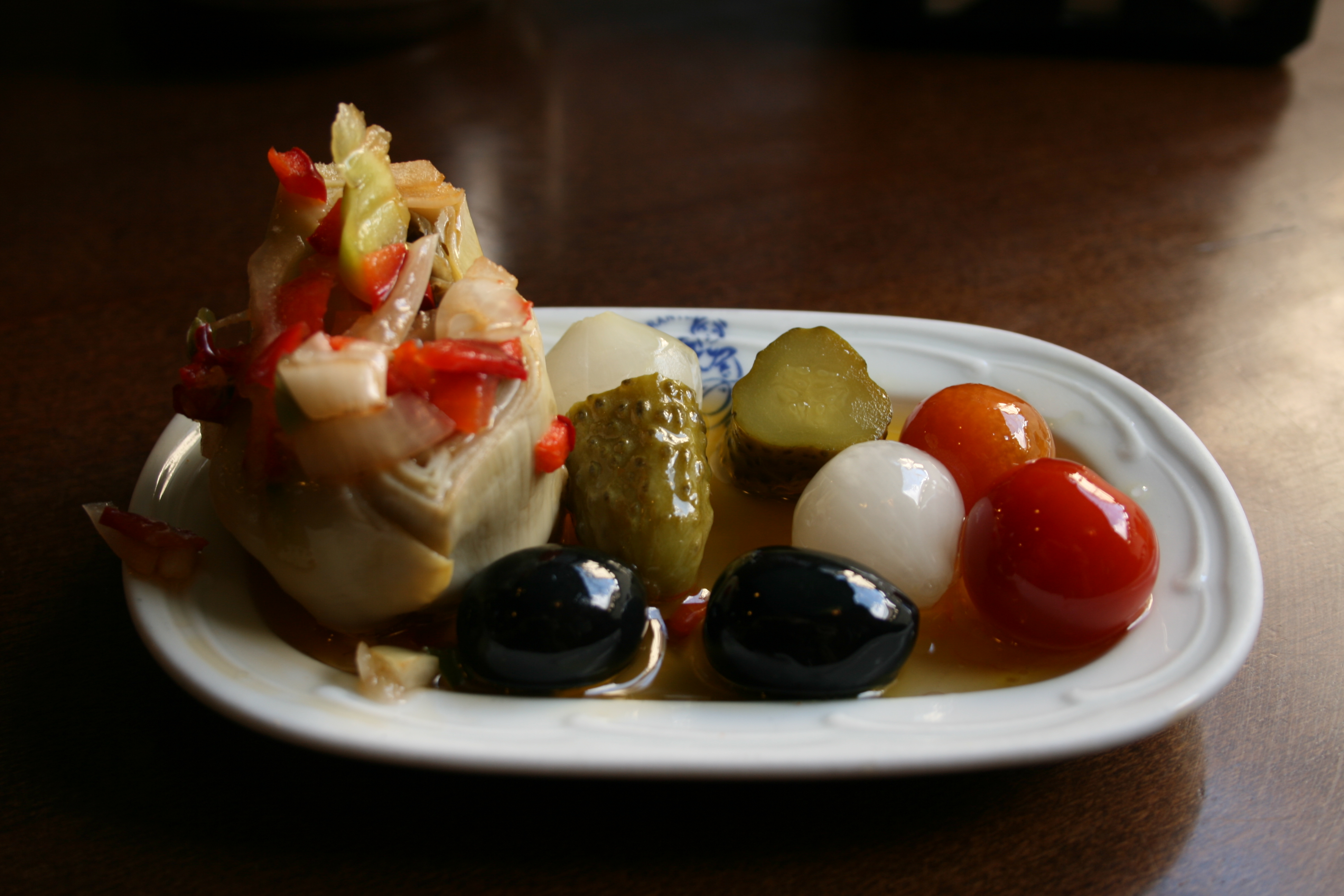
An artichoke heart, olives, cherry tomatoes, and other savory items combined into a tapas plate

Tapas are appetizers or snacks in Spanish cuisine. Available in a wide variety, they may be cold (such as mixed olives and cheese) or warm (such as chopitos, which are battered, fried baby squid). In select restaurants and bars in Spain, tapas have evolved into their own sophisticated cuisine. Throughout the nation, diners can order many different tapas and combine them to make a full meal. In some Central American countries, such snacks are known as bocas.

== List of tapas ==
Name	Image	Description
Banderillas		Also called pinchos de encurtidos, are cold tapas made from small food items pickled in vinegar and skewered together. They are also known as gildas or piparras and consist of pickled items, like olives, baby onions, baby cucumbers, chiles (guindilla) with pieces of pepper and other vegetables. Sometimes they include an anchovy.
Chorizo a la sidra		Chorizo sausage slowly cooked in cider
Croquetas		A common sight in bar counters and homes across Spain, served as a tapa, a light lunch, or a dinner along with a salad
Empanadillas		Large or small turnovers filled with meats and vegetables
Fried cheese		A tapas dish in Spain
Mejillones tigre ("tiger mussels")		Chopped mussel meat in a spiced bechamel, served breaded and fried on the half shell
Patatas bravas		Fried potatoes with a spicy paprika-based sauce
Padrón pepper		Padrón peppers fried in olive oil until the skin starts to blister and the pepper collapses.
Pa amb tomàquet		bread with tomato

== See also ==
- List of Spanish dishes
