= Chilluévar =

Chilluévar, Spain
- city
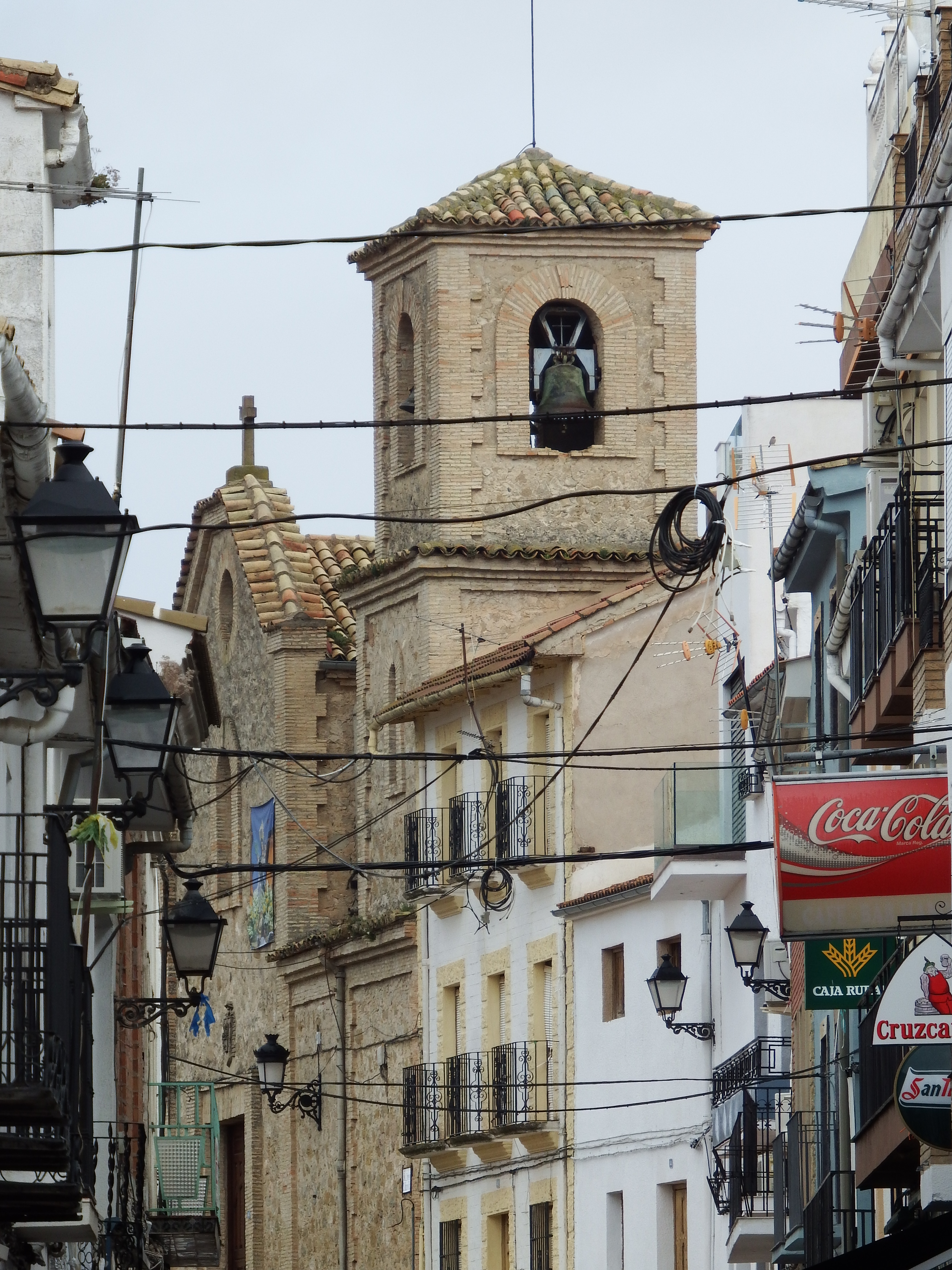
- View of Chilluévar

- Coat of arms

- Location in the Province of Jaén Chilluévar (Andalusia) Chilluévar (Spain)
- Coordinates: 38°00′N 3°01′W
- Country: Spain
- Autonomous community: Andalusia
- Province: Jaén
- Municipality: Chilluévar

Area
  - Total: 37 km^{2} (14 sq mi)
- Elevation: 738 m (2,421 ft)

Population (2025-01-01)
  - Total: 1,309
  - Density: 35/km^{2} (92/sq mi)
- Time zone: UTC+1 (CET)
  - Summer (DST): UTC+2 (CEST)

Chilluévar is a city located in the province of Jaén, Spain. According to the 2006 census (INE), the city has a population of 1629 inhabitants.

Chilluévar is a city located in province of Jaén, Spain. According to the 2006 census (INE), the city has a population of 1629 inhabitants. Chilluevar is located on the north region of Alto Guadalquivir the northeast edge of which is part of the Cazorla, Segura, and Las Villas mountain range. Its territory is eminently agricultural and dependent on the olive grove. This crop occupies the sloping lands that go from the North and East to the rivers Vega and Cañamares in the south, southeast and southwest, where herbaceous crops are found. The closeness between the labour lands and the mountain chain has created an adequate habitat for cynegetic animals of minor haunting and for insectivorous birds, nevertheless haunting has made the population of these species minimal. The urban center is typical for its narrow and sloping streets. Besides the principal nucleus, where the majority of the population is concentrated. The hamlets of Los Almansas, Los Romos, and Chilluevar La Vieja also belong to this township.

== History ==
The oldest finds in the region go back to the time of the Iberians, in the village of Almansas, and the Roman age, where it had an intense occupation by means of rural villages. From this age there has been preserved a set of funerary inscriptions in the Provincial Museum.

Chilluévar has been identified with Alconray, a place mentioned firstly at 1256, at Muslim age. It may be referred to the Alcorahe mentioned at 1384 in a document of King Juan I.

The impulse and consolidation of the nucleus of Chilluevar started in 1231, the date when this land became part of the “Adelantamiento de Cazorla” patrimony of the Archdiocese of Toledo. Two circumstances contributed to the development of this village: on the one hand the flourishing of the constructions promoted by the Cardinal of Toledo, “Don Rodrigo Ximenez de Rada”, in his aim of promoting the christian faith on the land conquered to Muslims, and on the other hand, the transfer of cattle through that place, due to being an obligated path in the way from Andalucia to Levante for the “Mesta”. In “Chilluevar la Vieja”, as is commonly known the primitive emplacement, a hermitage, an inn, a cemetery and a swimming pool was constructed. Cattle ranchers, pilgrims and merchants used to visit the hermitage, found rest in the inn and made the cattle rest.

The disappearance of the Mesta and the migration of cattle had, as a result, the progressive decay and marginalization of this emplacement, nevertheless, this decline was not homogeneous in all the region as at the end of the 17th century a new church was built in what is denominated as “Chilluevar Nuevo”, about 1.2 kilometres from the earlier hermitage. In 1787 the village received the title of "town" granted by the Cardinal Lorenzana, this title endorsed its recognition as an urban nucleus.

The first years of the 20th century were determined by a long process of segregation of Chilluévar from the municipality of Iruela, which was finished on 14 December 1926, with the municipal independence of the Chuilluévar.

== Monuments ==
- Parish church of Our Lady of the Rosary
- Roman road and Roman bridge on the Cañamares river.
- Archaeological remains of the Roman site of Los Almansas.

== Climatology ==
Chilluévar ́s municipality is influenced by the mediterranean weather, characterized by cold winters with little rain at the end of it, and warm and dry summers.

== Festivities ==
=== Patronal festivity in honour of Our Lady of the Peace (24/01) ===
Along with Bémez de la Moraleda and Beas de Segura, Chilluevar has as it Patroness the Virgin of Peace. In her honour, 24 January is celebrated as a festivity with a religious mass and a procession of her image. One of the things for which this festivity is known are the colossal luminaries that are raised all over the municipality the night before, created by the neighbours with the remains of the pruning of the olive tree; it is typical the bread with oil and roasted potatoes.

=== Festivity of San Isidro (15/05) ===
San Isidro and the Virgin of Peace are the patroners of Chilluevar: it is organised by the Fraternity of Labourers and it consists of making a festival working day, besides religious events in honour of the protectors of agriculture, not usually missing the delicious sausages for which Chuilluevar is known.

=== Fairs and Festivals in honor of Our Lady of Peace ===
In honor of the Lady of Peace, this town of la Villas´s chain, celebrates its fair from September 3 to 7, being Day 4 the Lady´s celebration. In addition to the different religious acts that honor Our Chuilluevar's Lady, the name for which was known in the 19th century, stands out the bullfighting festivities with loose heifers and the verbena where you can taste the mountain cuisine that stands out for the por sauzales and big game.

== Gastronomy ==
=== Salty foods ===
- Gachas migas (with bacon and dried peppers).
- Talarines (dough cakes with mushrooms and hare or partridge).
- Tortilla serrana (omelette made with a lot of sausage dough)
- Trout
- Lamb with rosemary
- Melojas.
- Wrought garlic.
- Tortilla de collejas
- Ajoharina

=== Confectionery ===
- Rice pudding
- sweet porridge
- Papajotes

== See also ==
- List of municipalities in Jaén
