= Leonese =

Leonese may refer to:

- Leonese people
- Leonese language
- Leonese Region
- Leonese cuisine
