= Shishito =

East Asian variety of pepper

Shishito pepper
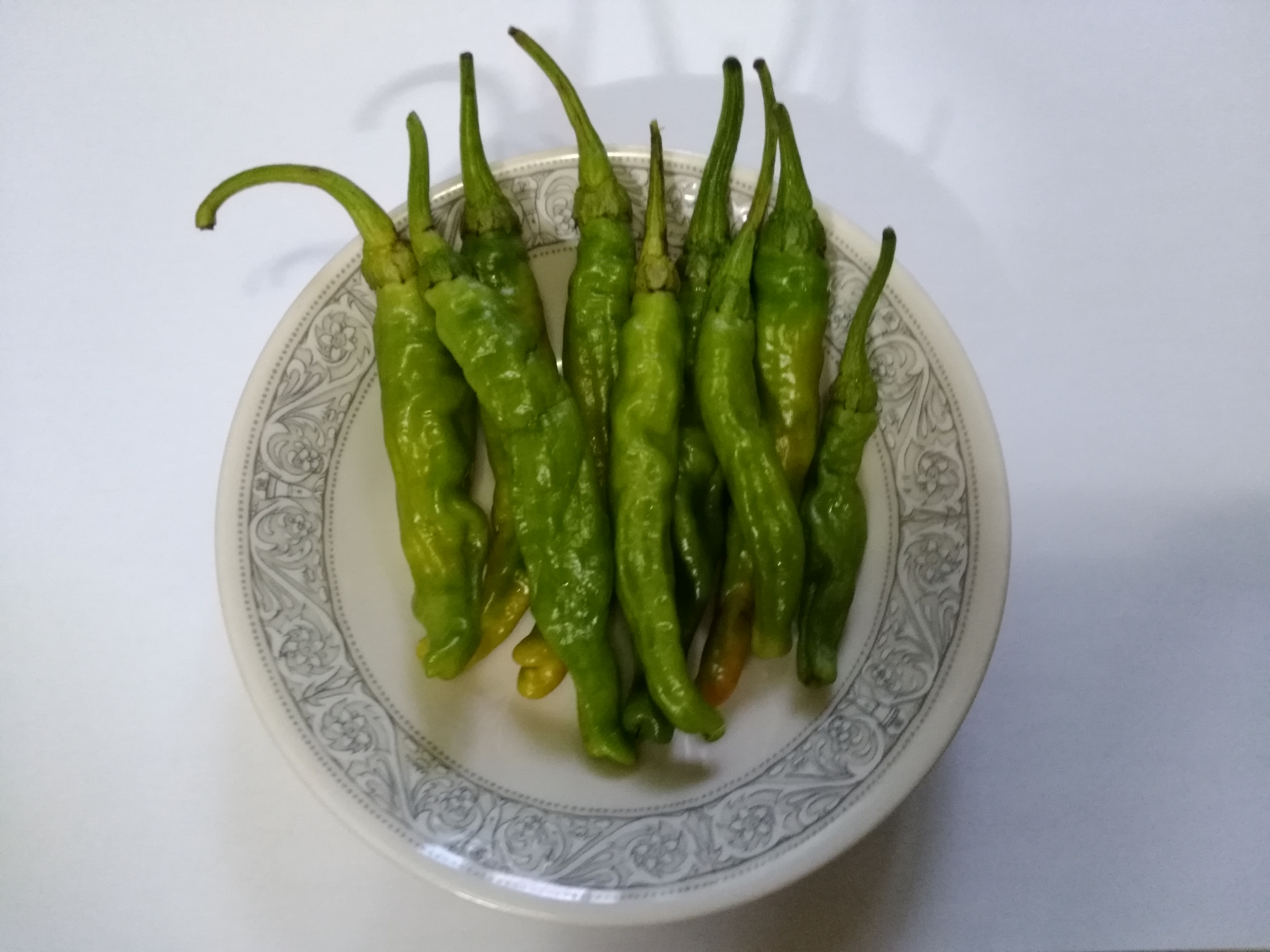
- Species: Capsicum annuum
- Cultivar: Shishito
- Origin: Asia
- Heat: Mild
- Scoville scale: 0–100 SHU

Shishito pepper (獅子唐辛子, Shishitōgarashi; 꽈리고추) is a popular, normally mild East Asian pepper variety of the species Capsicum annuum.

== Characteristics ==
The pepper is small and finger-long, slender, and thin-walled. Although it turns from green to red upon ripening, it is usually harvested while green. The name refers to the fact that the tip of the chili pepper (唐辛子, tōgarashi) looks like the head of a lion (獅子, shishi); in Japanese, it is often abbreviated as shishitō.

About one out of every ten peppers is spicy. The occurrence of pungent fruit is induced by such factors as exposure to sunlight, and other environmental stresses.

The prefectural agricultural testing center at Kishigawa, Wakayama stated in 2005 that capsaicin forms more easily in hot and dry conditions in the summer, and even experts may not be able to distinguish relative hotness on the same plant.

For cooking, a hole is poked in the pepper beforehand to keep expanding hot air from bursting the pepper. It may be skewered then broiled (grilled), pan-fried in oil, stewed in a soy sauce– and dashi-based liquid, or simply eaten raw in a salad or as a condiment. It is thin-skinned and will blister and char easily compared with thicker-skinned varieties of peppers.

== Gallery ==
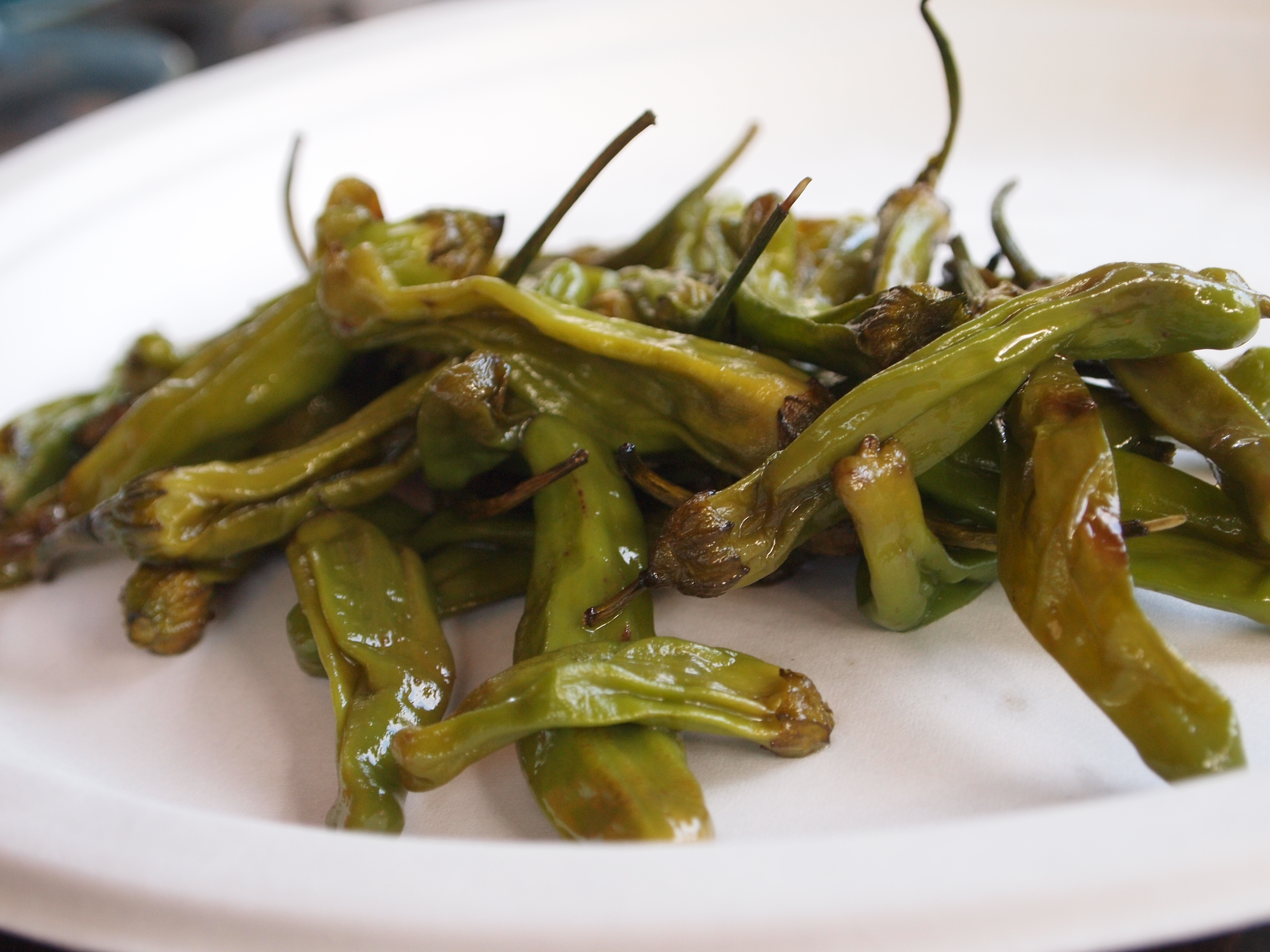
Grilled shishito peppers

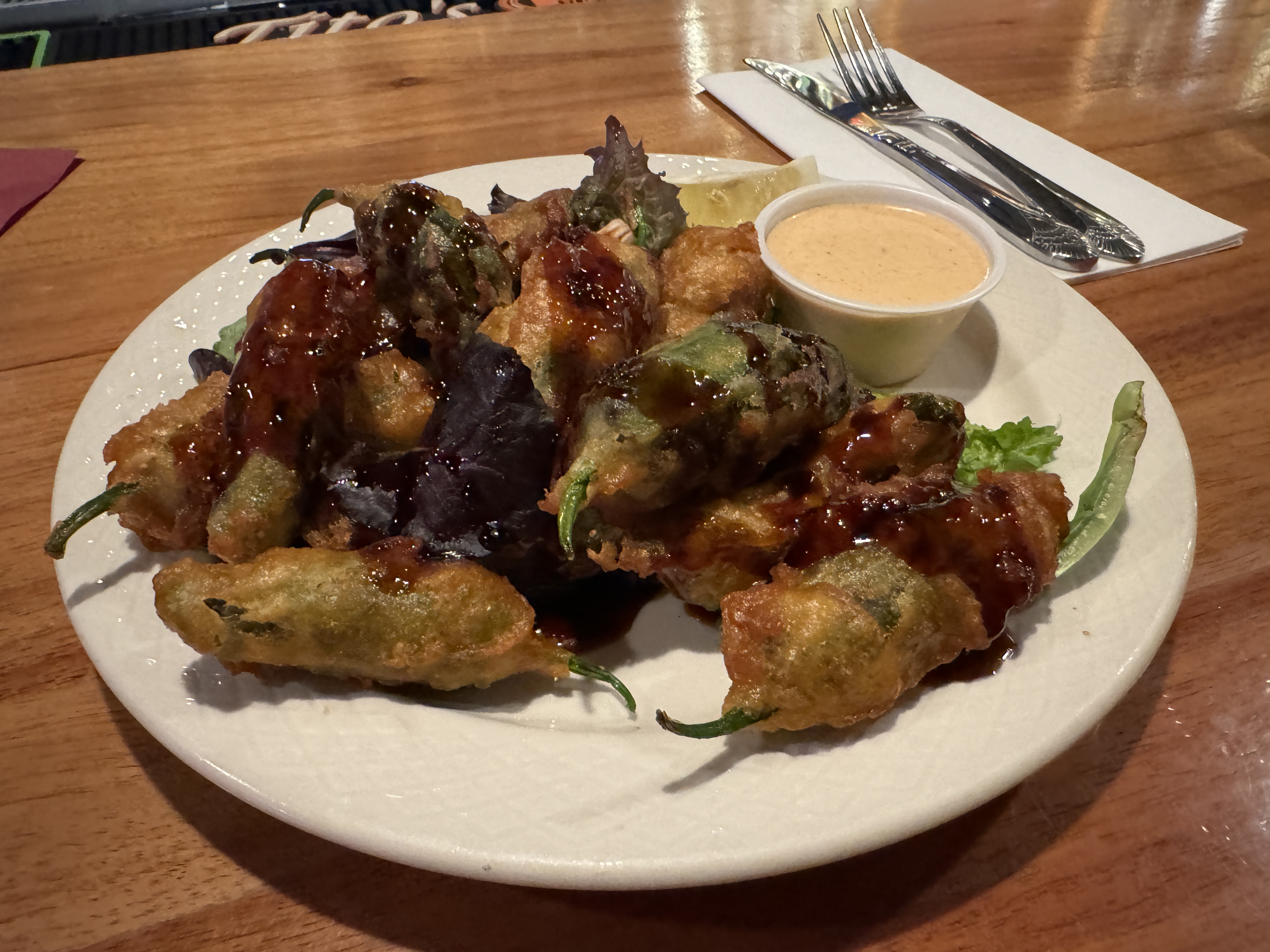
Fried shishito peppers in Fort Bragg, California

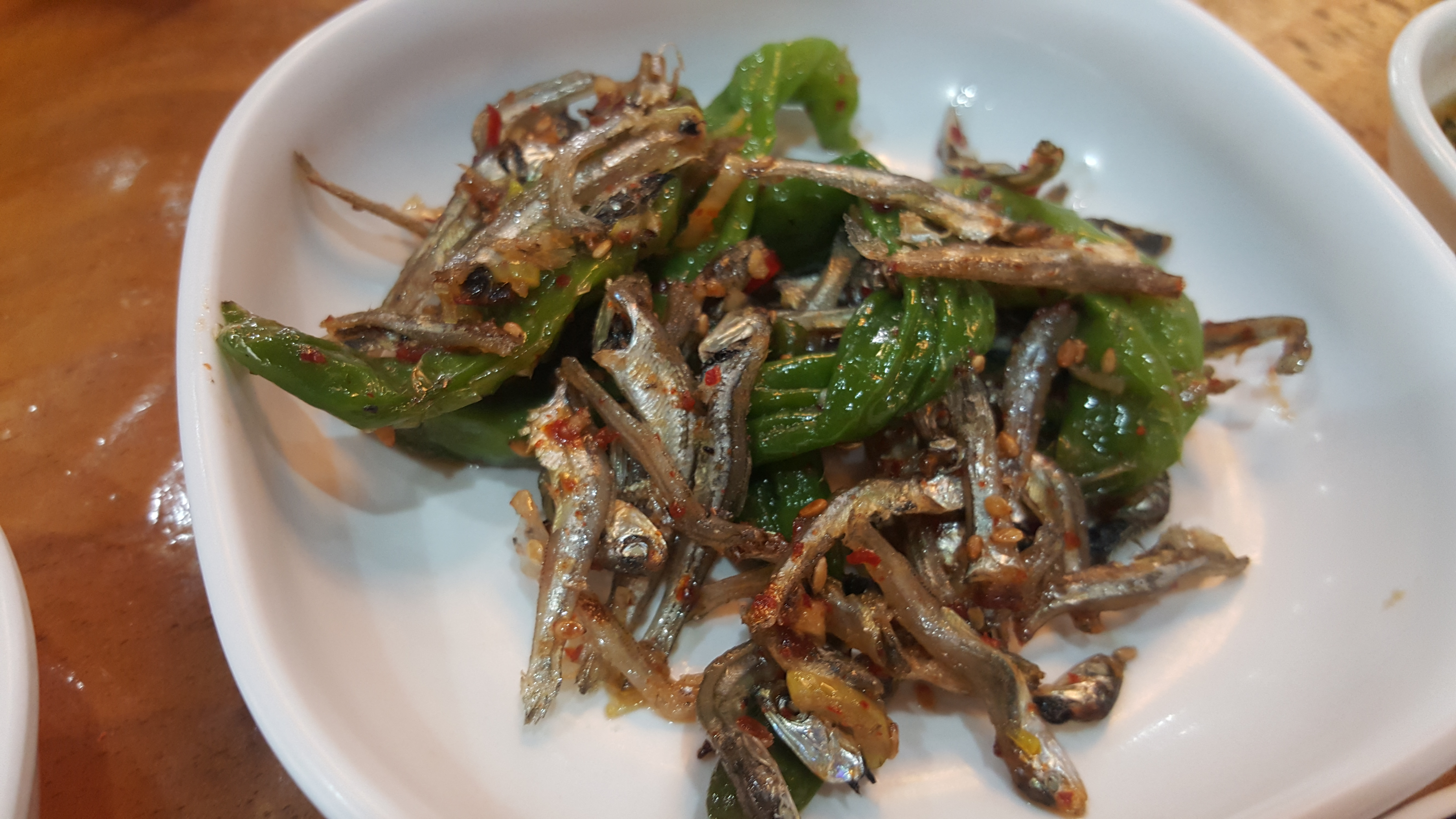
Kkwari-gochu-myeolchi-bokkeum (stir-fried shishito peppers with dried anchovies)

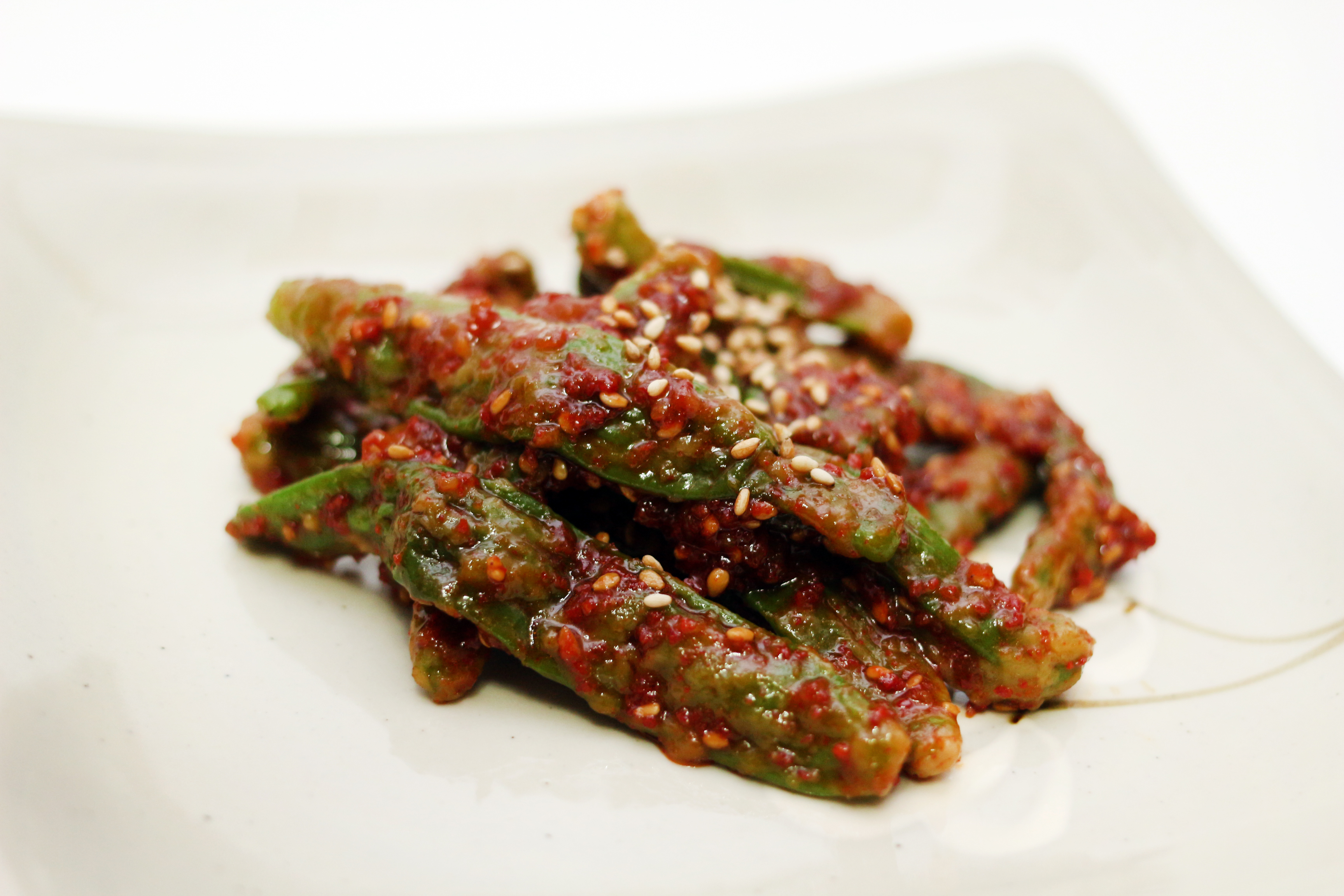
Kkwari-gochu-jangajji (pickled shishito peppers)

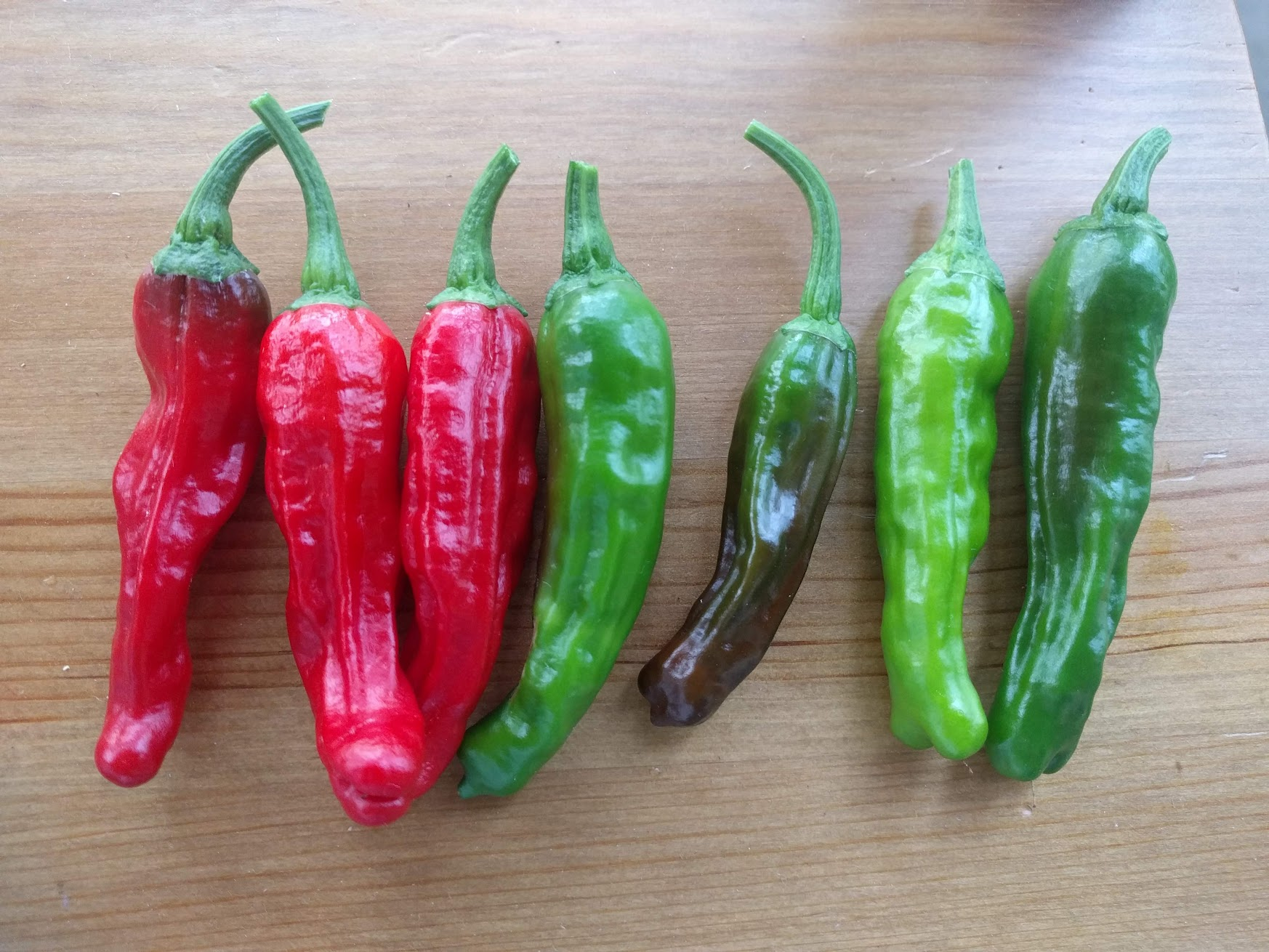
Shishito peppers shortly after being picked

== See also ==
- Shichimi, chili pepper in Japan
- Padrón pepper, a similarly used pepper in Spain
