= Padrón pepper =

Variety of pepper from Padrón, Spain

Padrón
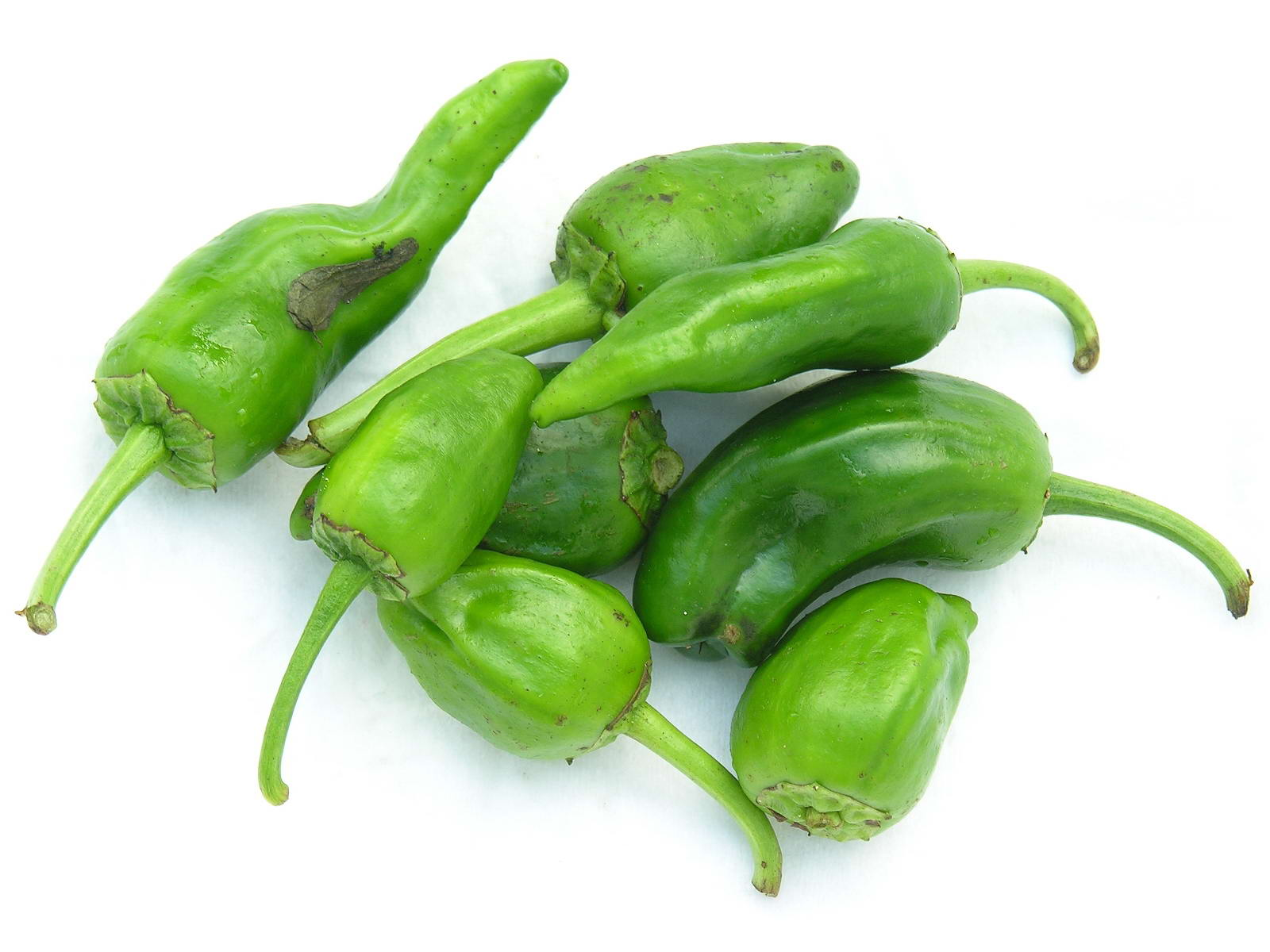
- Unripe Padrón peppers
- Species: Capsicum annuum
- Origin: Galicia, Spain
- Heat: Mild
- Scoville scale: 500 to 2,500 SHU

Padrón pepper, also called Herbón pepper, is a landrace variety of pepper (Capsicum annuum) from the municipality of Padrón in northwestern Spain (mainly in the valley of the parish of Herbón).

== Characteristics ==
Padrón peppers are small, about 2 inches (5 cm) long and have an elongated shape. They are often picked, sold and eaten unripe, when they are still green. The taste is mild, but some exemplars can be quite hot. This property has given rise to the popular Galician aphorism "Os pementos de Padrón, uns pican e outros non" ("Padrón peppers, some are hot, and some are not"). Drought-stressed plants tend to produce hotter peppers. Like several other peppers, Padrón peppers become spicier as they mature. Their ripe colour is red.

== Cultivation ==
The species Capsicum annuum is native to southern North America, the Caribbean, and northern South America where it was domesticated. The Padrón pepper variety originates from the municipality of Padrón in the province of A Coruña, Galicia, northwestern Spain. European Union law has protected the name pemento de Herbón as a protected designation of origin since 2010. Padrón peppers are now also grown elsewhere in the Mediterranean and in the United States.

Padrón peppers are picked when immature and green.

== Culinary preparation ==
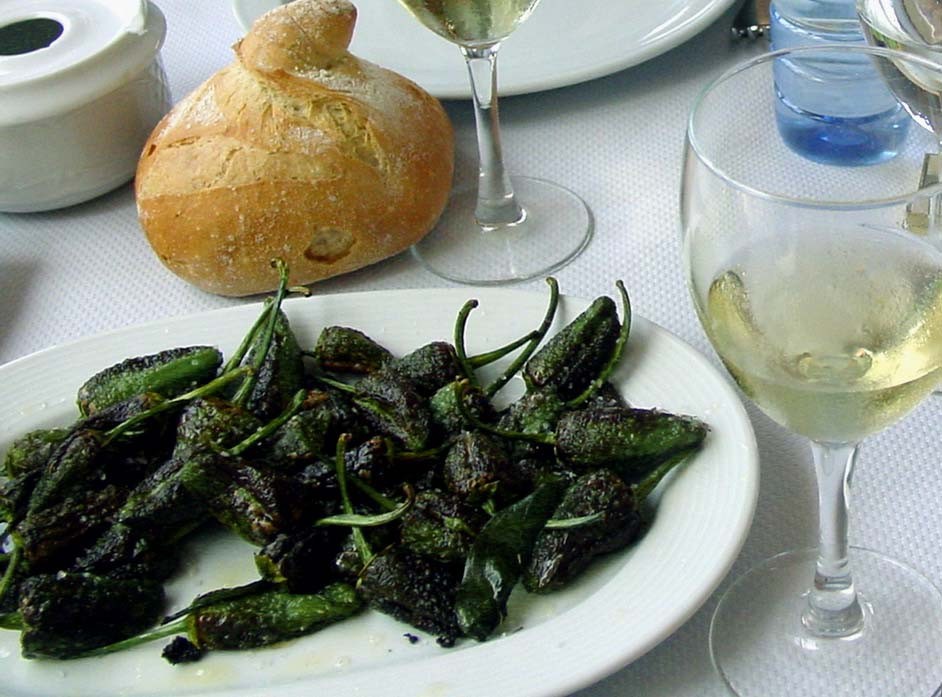
Padrón peppers with bread and wine

Padrón peppers are customarily fried in olive oil until the skin starts to blister and the pepper collapses.

In and around the town of Padrón, the stems are removed before frying. Removing the stems is recommended by major Galician pepper producers and the head of the Galician tourism association on the grounds that they cause bitterness in fried peppers. Elsewhere, the stems are generally left on the peppers, and the stems are used to hold the peppers while eating.

Fried Padrón peppers are typically served hot with a dusting of coarse salt, sometimes accompanied by chunks of bread, as tapas.

== See also ==
- List of Capsicum cultivars
- Shishito, a very similarly used pepper in Japan
