= Zarangollo =

Spanish egg dish

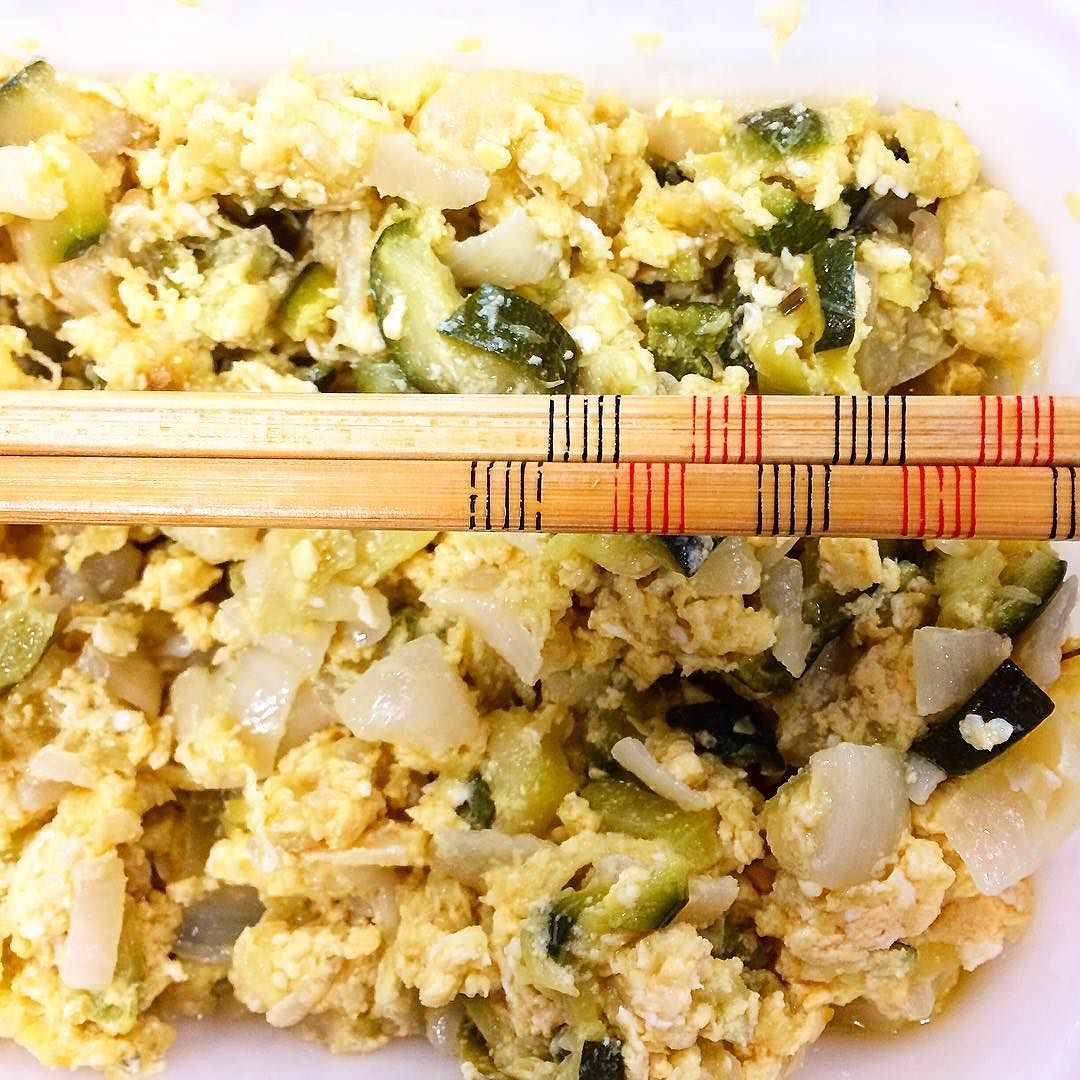
- Alternative names: Spain
- Course: Hors d'oeuvre
- Place of origin: Murcia
- Main ingredients: Eggs, zucchini, onions, occasionally potatoes

Zarangollo is a common dish in the Murcian countryside in Spain. It is frequently served in tapas bars in the area.

The dish is scrambled eggs with courgette, onion, and occasionally potatoes. All the ingredients but the eggs are sliced very finely, fried in olive oil, and then mixed with the beaten eggs. The dish is served hot, and is generally served as an appetizer accompanied with wine, or as a side dish accompanying a fish main course.

== Variations ==
In regards to potato, traditionally zarangollo did not contain it, but it started incorporating it in default of zucchini. Nowadays it is common to find zarangollo prepared with both ingredients.

== See also ==
- Pisto
