= Arroz a la cubana =

Rice, egg, tomato sauce, and plantain dish

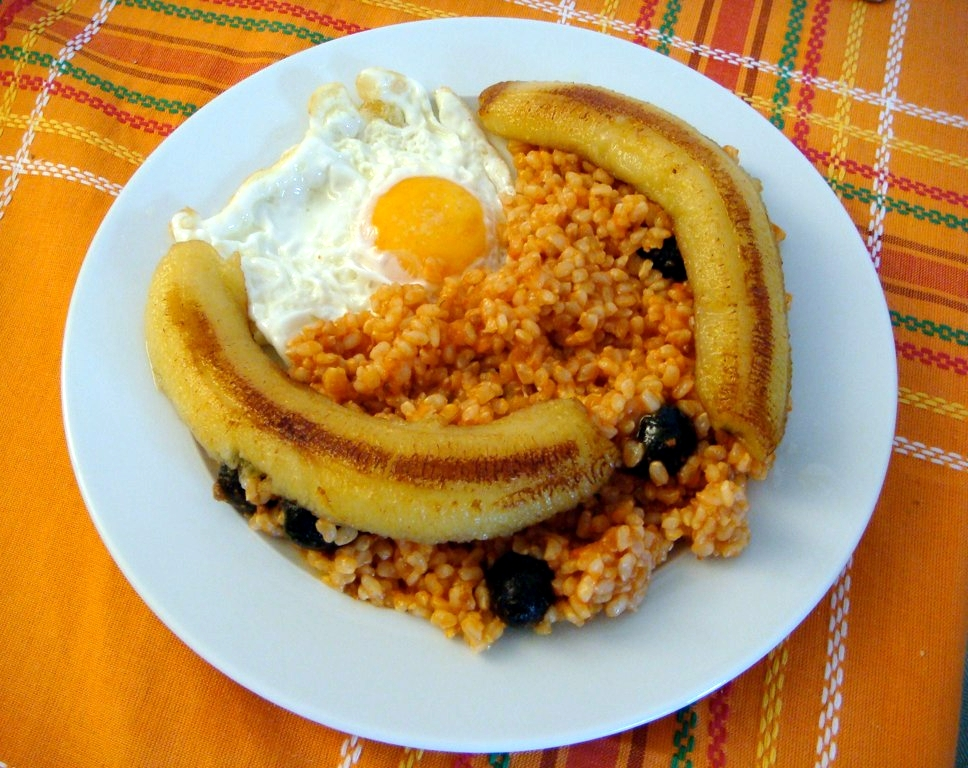
- Arroz a la cubana - Rice smothered with tomato sauce, plantains and a fried egg
- Course: Main course
- Place of origin: Unknown, possibly Spain
- Serving temperature: Hot
- Main ingredients: Rice, fried egg, tomato sauce

Arroz a la cubana (Spanish pronunciation: [aˈroθ a la kuˈβana]) ("Cuban-style rice") or arroz cubano is a rice dish popular in Spain, the Philippines, and parts of Latin America. Its defining ingredients are rice and a fried egg. A fried banana (plantain or other cooking bananas) and tomato sauce (tomate frito) are so frequently used that they are often considered defining ingredients too.

Despite the name, the dish does not exist in Cuban cuisine and its origins are not definitively known. It may possibly originate from a Spanish misinterpretation of common Cuban meals of eating rice with stews and a fried egg when Cuba was still a Spanish colony.

== By region ==
=== Spain ===
In Spain, a typical dish of arroz a la cubana consists of a serving of white rice (which is sometimes shaped into small mounds using a glass), tomato sauce (tomate frito) and a fried egg. While the most traditional recipe includes a fried plantain (plátano), it is also common to find the recipe using sausages and bacon. It is typical to cut and mix all the ingredients before eating, allowing the yolk of the egg to melt and combine everything well.

=== Philippines ===
Arroz a la cubana has been eaten in the Philippines since Spanish colonial times. Like in other versions, it comes with white rice, fried egg, and some ripe fried cardava or saba banana, sliced length-wise.

It differs significantly from the Spanish and Latin American versions in that instead of tomate frito, it always includes ground meat (giniling, usually beef) in tomato sauce. This component is typically cooked picadillo-style, with minced potatoes, carrots, raisins, peas, onions, garlic, and other ingredients in a tomato-based sauce seasoned with patis (fish sauce), soy sauce, and sometimes chilis.

A regional variant of arroz a la cubana is arroz de Calamba from Calamba, Laguna. It differs in that it is served with strips of smoked fish (tinapa).

=== Peru ===
In Peru, it is common for the dish to consist of white rice, fried plantain, a fried hot-dog wiener, and a fried egg over the white rice.
