= Chireta =

Aragonese type of savoury pudding

- Alternative names: Gireta, girella
- Type: Sausage
- Place of origin: Spain
- Region or state: Aragon
- Main ingredients: Sheep (intestines, liver, neck, heart, lungs, tripe), rice, pancetta or bacon or cured ham

Chireta is an Aragonese type of savoury pudding. It is a rustic dish typical to the counties of Ribagorza, Sobrarbe and Somontano de Barbastro in the Spanish Pyrenees. In the Catalan counties of Alta Ribagorça and Pallars, formerly territories united to the historic County of Ribagorza in medieval Aragon, chireta is known as gireta, or girella, respectively.

The dish uses offal and other parts of a slaughtered sheep not considered choice cuts. These include the intestines, tripe, neck meat, minced liver including heart and lungs. To this, rice, chopped pancetta or bacon, cured ham, parsley, garlic, a pinch of cinnamon, salt and white pepper are added.

Chireta literally means "inside out"—i.e., the sheep's intestines which make up the casings are cleaned and turned inside out for a smoother, more appetizing appearance.

The casing is cleaned in white vinegar then rinsed very well before filling. The filling contains rice mixed with garlic, parsley and seasoned chopped meats. Casings are filled about a half to two-thirds of the way with the rice mixture, taking care not to overfill them, as the rice will expand once the chiretas are boiled in the broth—otherwise they are likely to burst. Once trussed, and just before cooking, they are also examined to make sure any air pockets are pushed out.

Chiretas are usually served hot, as a main dish. They can be also served up as tapas, sliced, dipped in an egg-flour batter, and fried to a golden color.

Chiretas can be found on the menu in restaurants of the Ribagorza, and Sobrarbe regions, and can also be sampled as tapas in the wine valley cuisine of the Somontano area.

In 2002, a Somontano meat packer initiated a chireta festival, which has been running every year since then, around the third weekend of October. In 2002, they achieved a record entry in the Guinness World Records for the longest and heaviest chireta in the world: 103.75 m (340.4 ft) long, weighing a total of 220 kg (490 lb).
