= Ajoblanco =

Type of cold soup from Andalusia, Spain

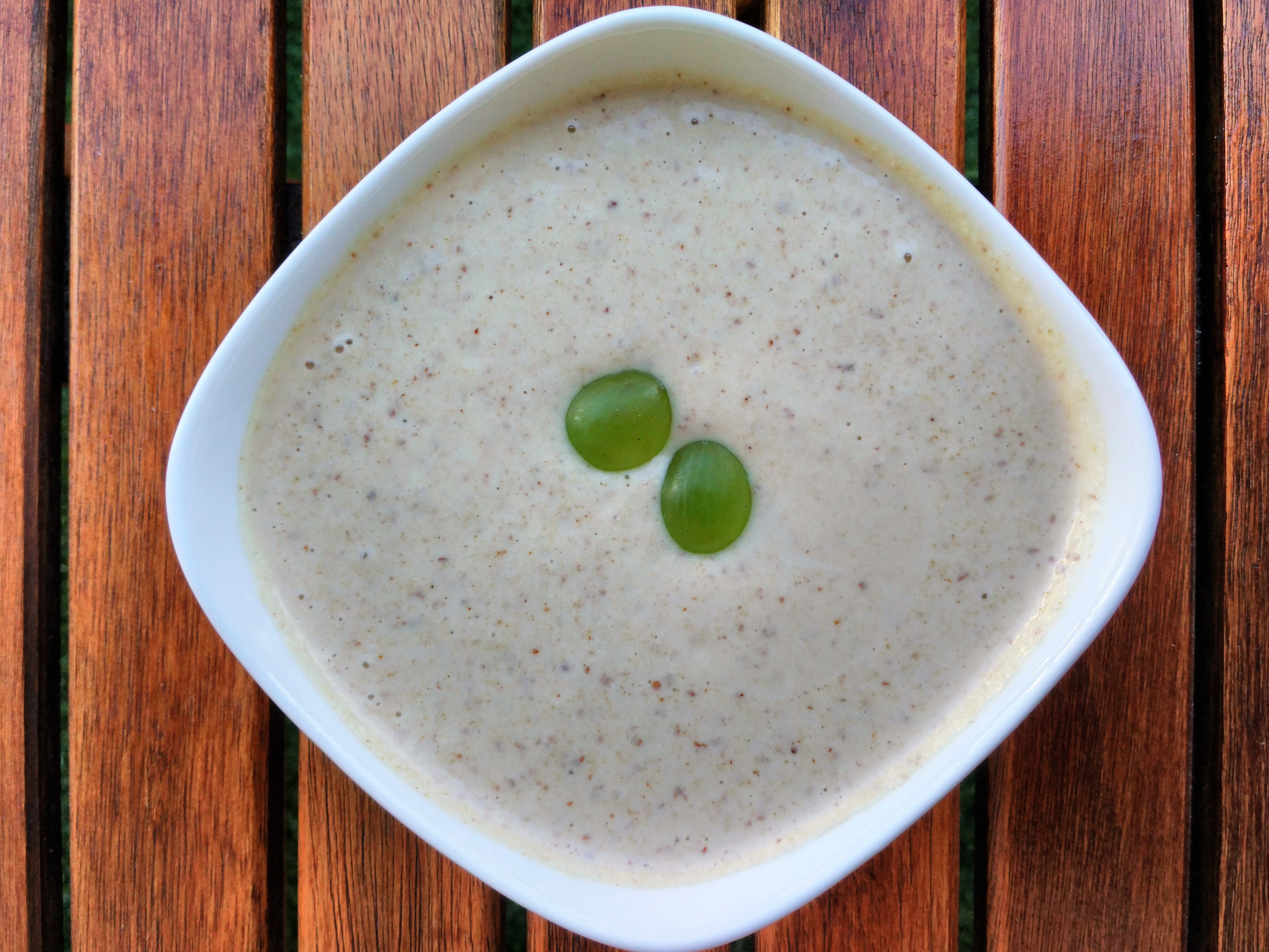
- Ajoblanco served with grapes
- Alternative names: Ajo blanco, white gazpacho
- Course: Appetiser
- Place of origin: Spain
- Region or state: Andalusia
- Serving temperature: Cold
- Main ingredients: Bread, almonds, garlic, water, olive oil

Ajoblanco (sometimes written ajo blanco) is a popular Spanish cold soup typical from Granada and Málaga (Andalusia). This dish is made of bread, crushed almonds, garlic, water, olive oil, salt and sometimes vinegar. It is usually served with grapes or slices of melon. When almonds were not available, for instance during the post-war period, flour from dried beans was used.

Ajoblanco is sometimes referred to as "white gazpacho".

Extremaduran ajoblanco (ajoblanco extremeño) is a related though somewhat different dish, since it contains egg yolk in the emulsion as well as water, olive oil, garlic and bread, and while vegetables such as tomatoes or cucumbers may be added, it does not usually contain almonds.

== History ==
The dish has its origins in the Arab cuisine since almond, like many other foods and fruits, were introduced to Spain by the Arabs. The narrative that its origin is Roman cuisine, which was introduced to the Roman Province of Hispania is weak and has very little basis considering that almonds were introduced by the Arabs It would eventually become a traditional dish of Andalucía.

== Characteristics ==
The bread (generally hard bread) is soaked overnight in order to soften it. The almonds and the garlic are mixed together (sometimes with vinegar) with a mortar and pestle until a white paste is formed. Finally water and olive oil are added and the mixture is beaten until it has an emulsion-like texture.

== Serving ==
In some areas of Granada it is customary to have ajoblanco as an accompaniment to a "papa asada" (baked potato). When served this way, the soup is thinned so that it can be drunk directly from a glass.

In Málaga, ajoblanco is served with Muscat grapes or, less commonly, other fresh fruit, such as apple or melon. There is a current trend to experiment with other such combinations.

== Festival ==
The town of Almáchar, in the Axarquía region of Málaga, holds an annual Fiesta del Ajoblanco on the first Saturday of September, coinciding with the local grape harvest. The festival has been declared of Tourist Interest in Andalusia.

== See also ==
- Bread soup
- Garlic soup
- Sopa de ajo, another Spanish soup using garlic and bread as two of the main ingredients
- List of almond dishes
