= Leonese cuisine =

Regional culinary traditions of Spain

Leonese cuisine is a subcategory of Spanish cuisine from the Province of León.

== Embutidos ==
- Cecina from León is beef. In Leonese, cecina means "meat that has been salted and dried by means of air, sun or smoke". Cecina de León is made of the hind legs of beef, salted, smoked and air-dried in the province of León in northwestern Spain, and has protected designation of origin (PGI) status.

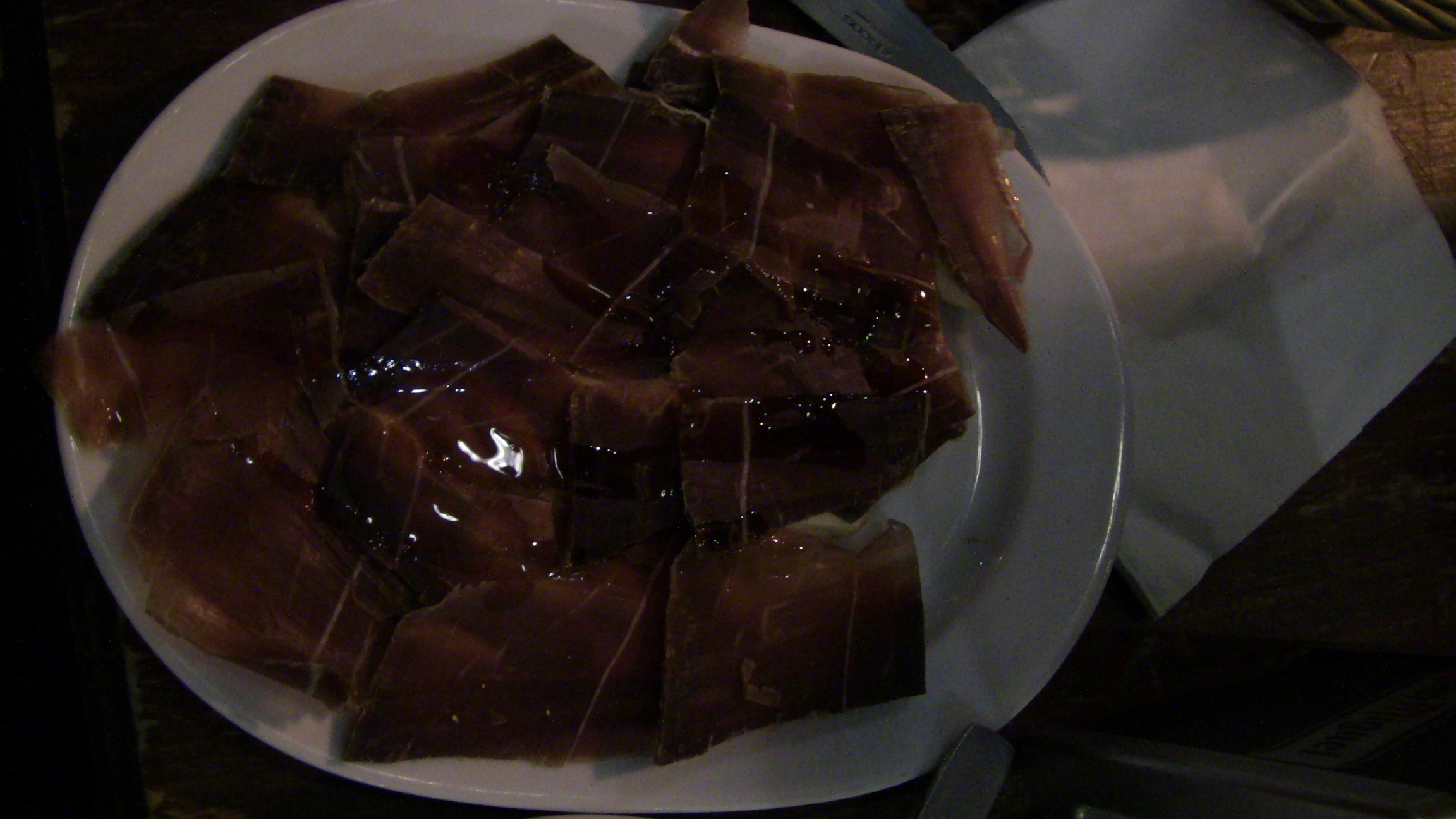
Cecina as served in a Madrid restaurant

- Botillo: Traditionally made in the western Leonese regions. Botiellu, in Leonese, is a dish of meat-stuffed pork intestine. It is a culinary specialty of El Bierzo, a county in the Spanish province of León and of the Portuguese region of Trás-os-Montes as well. This kind of embutido is a meat product made from different pieces left over from the butchering of a pig, including the ribs, tail and bones with a little meat left on them. These are chopped, seasoned with salt, pepper, garlic, and other spices, stuffed in the cecum of the pig, and partly cured via smoking. It can also include pork tongue, shoulder blade, jaw, and backbone, but never exceeding 20% of the total volume. It is normally consumed cooked, covered with a sheet. Also has a PGI status.

== Wines ==
- Bierzo: in the west of the Province of León and covers about 3,000 km^{2} (1,200 sq mi). The area consists of numerous small valleys in the mountainous part (Alto Bierzo) and of a wide, flat plain (Bajo Bierzo). The DO covers 23 municipalities.
- León: in the southeast of the Province of León.

== Sweets ==
- Mantecadas de Astorga
- Hojaldres de Astorga
- Lazos de San Guillermo
- Nicanores de Boñar
- Galletas de hierro

== Cheeses ==
- Queisu de Valdión

== See also ==
- León Province
- Castilian-Leonese cuisine
- Spanish cuisine
- List of Spanish dishes
