= Picota cherry =

Edible fruit cultivar

Picota is the name given to four varieties (cultivars) of sweet cherry grown from Prunus avium L. within the Jerte, Ambroz and La Vera mountain valleys in the north of the province of Cáceres, in the Autonomous Community of Extremadura, Spain. Picota varieties include; "Ambrunés", "Pico Limón Negro", "Pico Negro" and "Pico Colorado".

Picota cherries naturally separate from their stalks when picked, leading them to be referred to as "stemless" or "stalkless" cherries. The term "Picota" means "peaked" – this refers to the shape of the cherries, which have a slight peak at the end. Picota cherries are protected by a Denomination of Origin (DO) certificate, providing European Union, Protected Designation of Origin (PDO) status. To use the Picota name, cherries must be grown and packaged within the specified geographical area covering the farms within the Valley of the Jerte, farms above 500 metres in the District of La Vera, and farms above 600 metres altitude in the Valley of the Ambroz. The inspection body for the designation of protected origin is ‘Cereza del Jerte’ (Picota del Jerte).

As of 2013 there were 3,737 growers with registered farms covering an area of 9,856 hectares; their combined total potential production stands at 8,815 tonnes per annum. Around 40% of Picota production is exported with key markets including Germany and the UK. UK sales hit their peak in 2011, with 10 million punnets (2,500 tonnes) sold during the five-week season.
