= Torreznos =

Spanish fried pork belly chunks

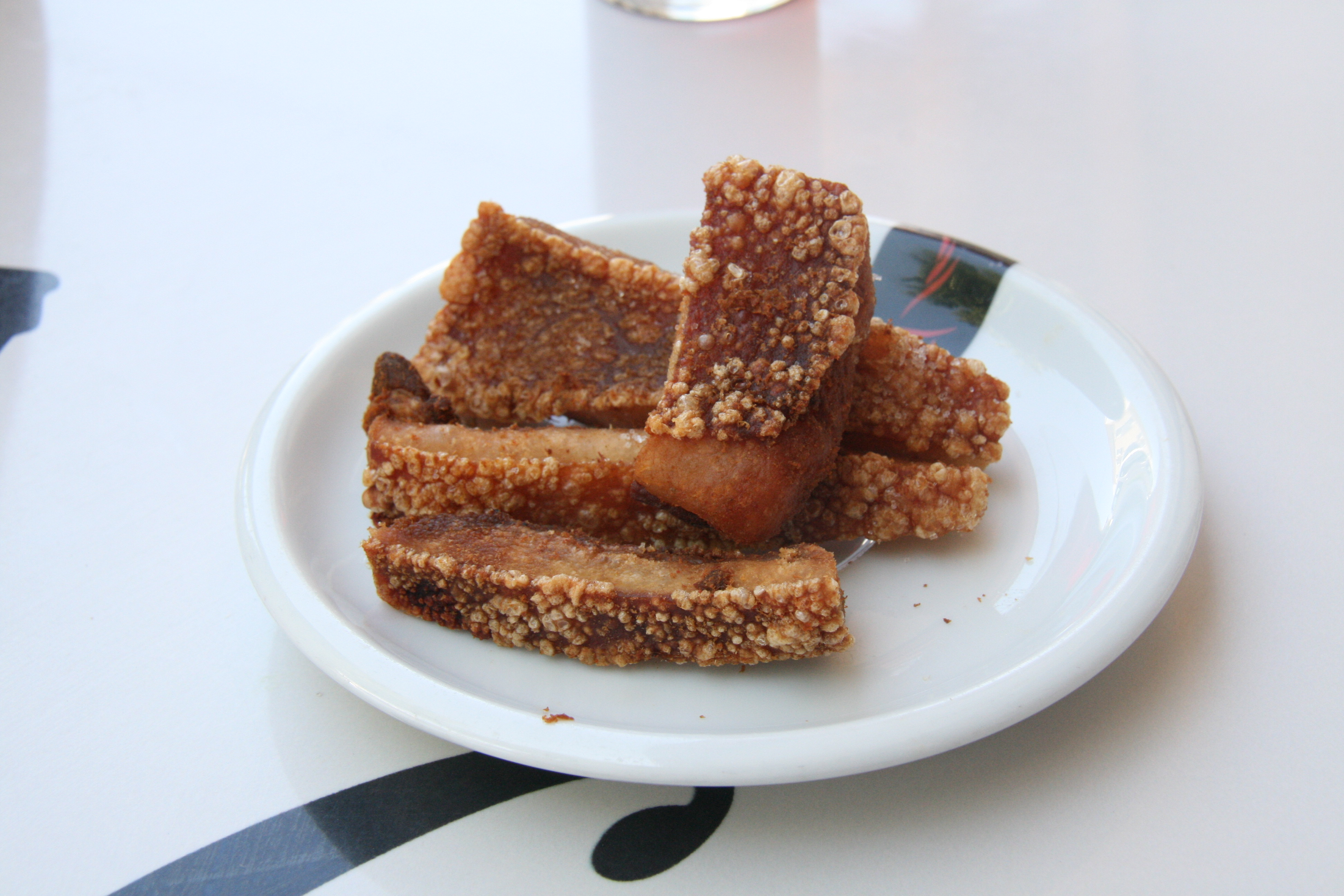
A snack of torreznos

Torrezno (plural: torreznos) is a kind of fried bacon snack produced in Spain.

A staple of bar tops in Spain, torreznos temporarily lost popularity to some extent due to its highly caloric nature. They are also sold as snack in supermarkets. They are made of the outer part of the pork belly, marinated with salt and paprika, cured (or also smoked), and later fried. Associated with Soria, torreznos produced there have been granted a specific marca de garantía. Back in 2014 The Guardian described torreznos as "deliciously decadent fried pork belly chunks".
