= Gachas =

Andalusian staple dish

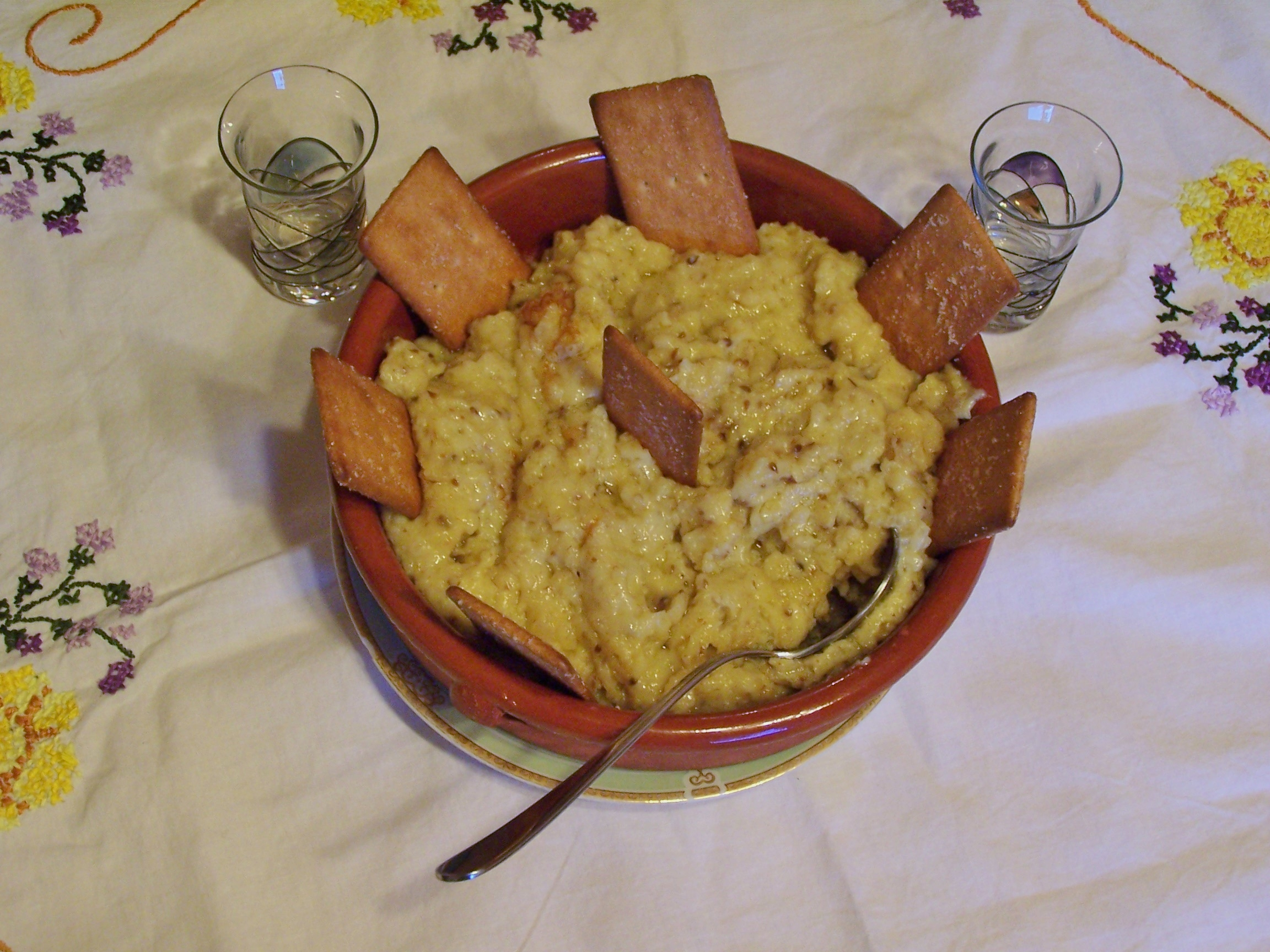
- Gachas de matalauva. Sweet gachas from Andalucía flavored with anise
- Course: Staple dish
- Place of origin: Spain
- Region or state: Andalusia, Castile-La Mancha, parts of Comunidad de Madrid, Region of Murcia, parts of Extremadura and Valencia
- Serving temperature: Warm
- Main ingredients: Wheat flour, grass pea flour or corn flour
- Variations: Sweet gachas (gachas dulces)

Gachas is an ancestral basic dish of central and southern Spain. It is a gruel whose main ingredients are flour, water, olive oil, garlic, paprika and salt.

== Origin ==
Gachas is considered an unrefined rural dish, the food of shepherds, farmers and itinerant labourers. It has been also described as a "fundamental gitano (gypsy) dish".

Gachas was largely replaced by rice and potato dishes in most areas of Spain during the 20th century, especially in the towns and cities. Consumption of this simple dish resurfaced during economic downturns and upheavals, such as the Spanish Civil War, earning it the name gachas de los años difíciles (gachas of the hard years). Certain modern chefs argue, though, that well-prepared gachas is not necessarily a coarse dish.

== Variations ==
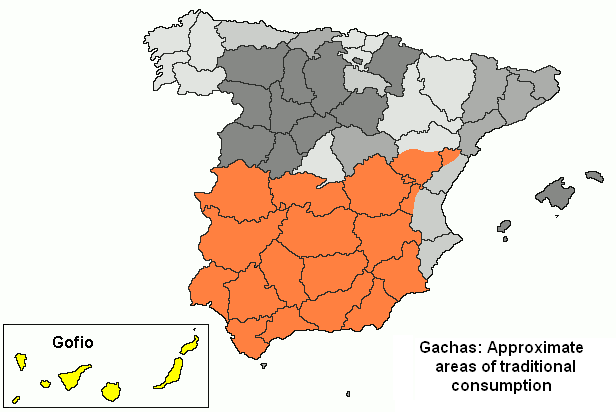
Approximate areas of traditional gachas consumption in Spain

=== Andalucía ===
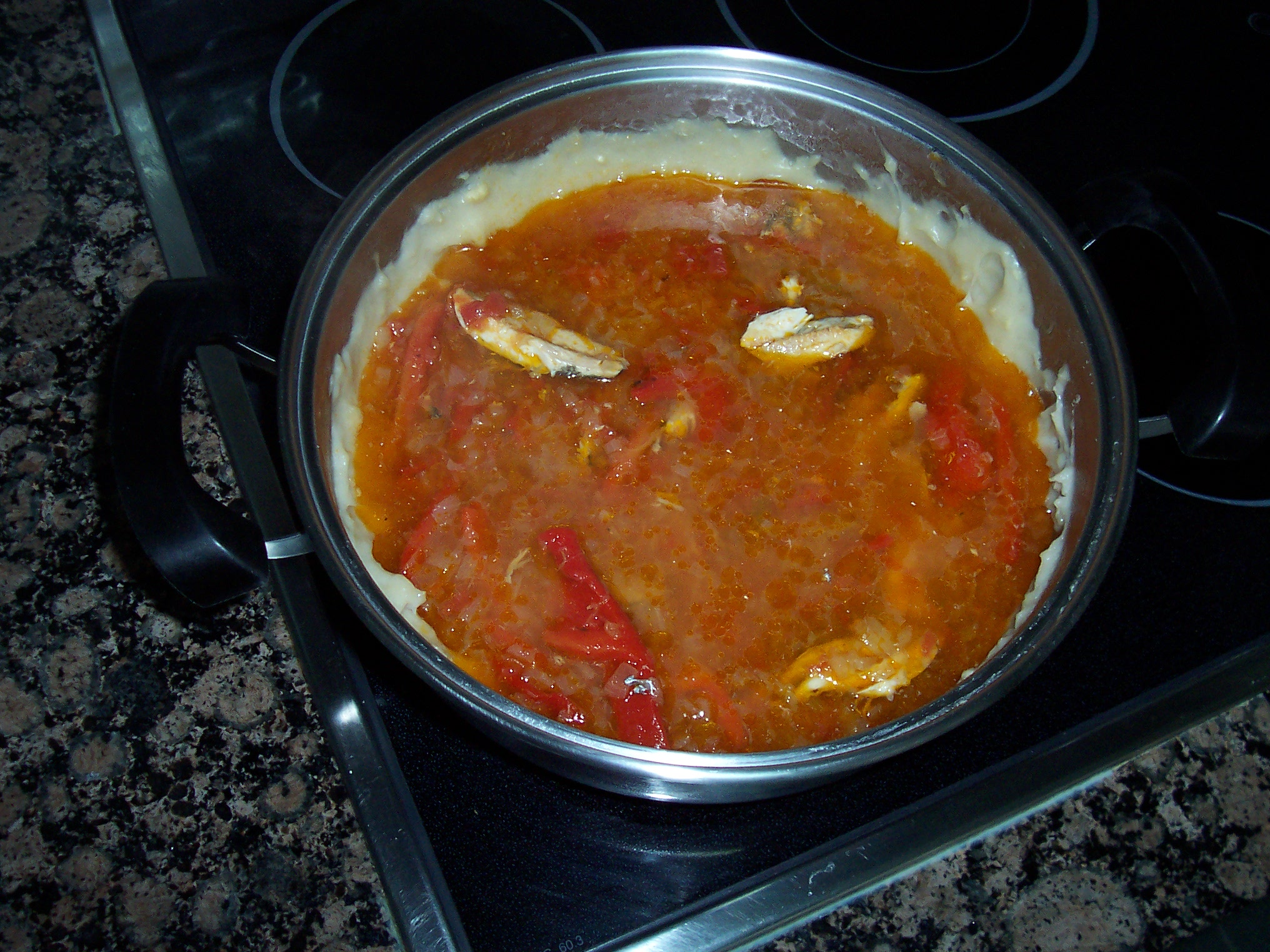
Gachas andaluzas with guisado (stew) on top.

Andalusian gachas, gachas andaluzas, are traditionally made of wheat flour. The traditional way of cooking them consists in frying garlic slices in olive oil until they are golden. Then the flour is added by sprinkling it over the hot oil with one hand and mixing well with the spoon until the mixture is slightly roasted. Water is added then, pouring it very slowly, while stirring the mixture all the while without interrupting the bubbling. Salt and water are added to taste and desired consistency, the gachas being ready when they "smell cooked".

There are many variations of the gachas in Andalusia itself, as the sweet poleá, the gachas colorás flavoured with paprika or saffron, or the gachas de matanza (butchery gachas), served with a stew with curdled blood, liver and offal. Fried onion and bread croutons may be also added in certain regions.

=== Castilla-La Mancha and Comunidad de Madrid (grass peas) ===
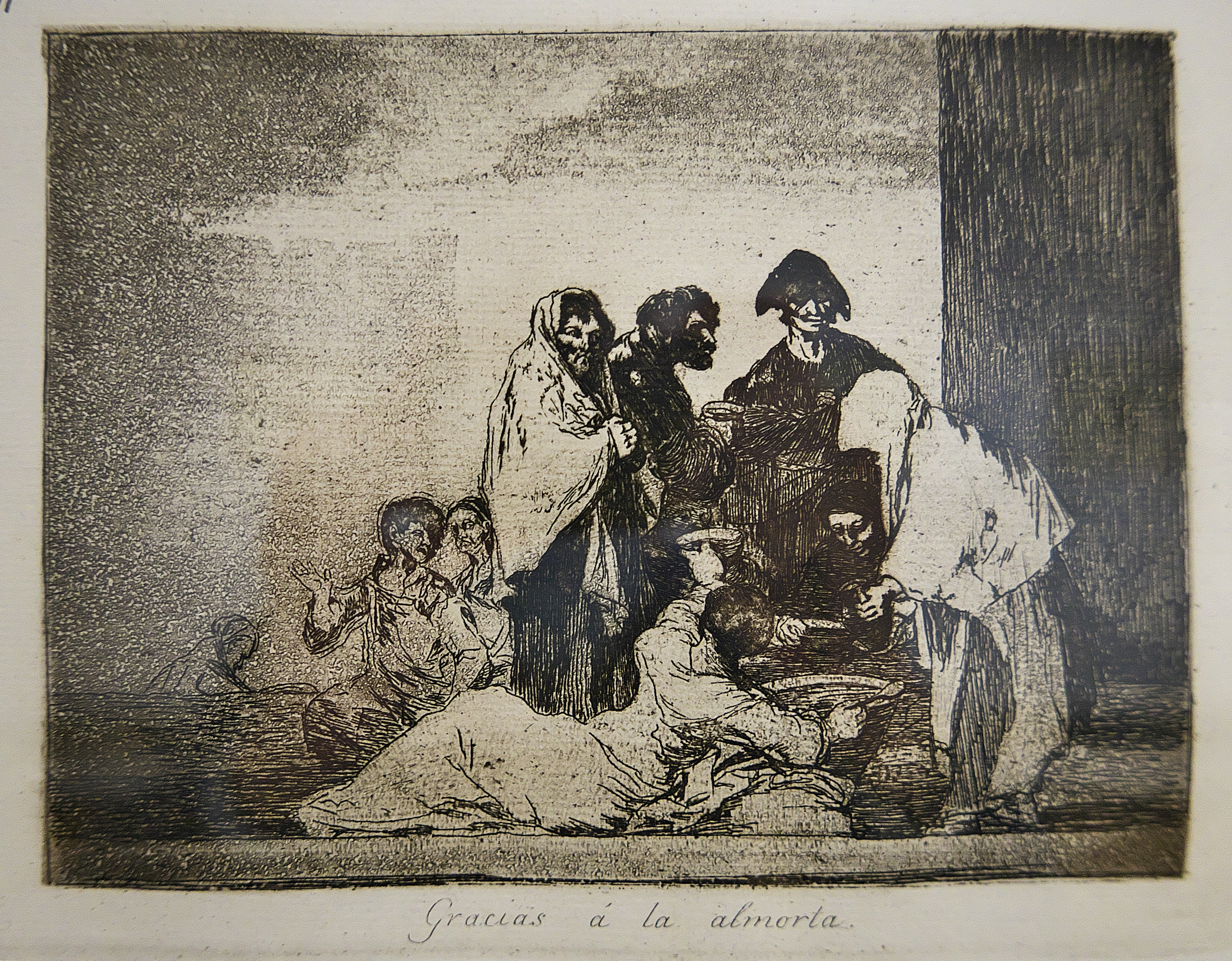
Gracias á la almorta, Goya print

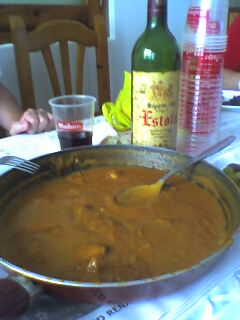
Gachas manchegas or grass pea flour gachas

Gachas manchegas or gachas de almorta is cooked with flour made from the grass peas (Lathyrus sativus, a legume; Spanish: almorta). Accompaniments for the dish vary throughout La Mancha and southern zones of La Alcarria. It was generally consumed during the cold winter months.

The gachas serranas of Cuenca is a local variant, usually served with mushrooms and potatoes (Called zarangullo). In the comarca of la Serranía, stewed and pickled pork liver and lung is added to the gachas when the water is added, or is eaten to accompany the gachas. Other possible accompaniments include hot chilis or pickled gherkins.

The gachas murcianas of the Murcia region is a variation of gachas manchegas spiced with caraway (Carum carvi), black pepper and cloves.

==== Toxicity of grass pea gachas ====
Grass peas, which grow well in dry conditions, can be toxic if eaten over a long period, causing lathyrism. Grass-pea products were banned for sale for human consumption in Spain from 1967 to 2018, due to toxicity. Grass pea flour remains difficult to obtain outside of Castilla-La Mancha, especially if not mixed with other flours; commercial forms are mixed with wheat flour because of the toxicity of grass peas if often eaten in large quantities.

Like other forms of gachas, gachas de almorta is resorted to in difficult times. Goya in his 1810–1815 The Disasters of War series illustrates the harm that can be done by excessive consumption of grass peas in times of famine in his print Gracias á la almorta (Thanks to the grass pea), about Napoleon's siege of Madrid. It depicts a woman who can no longer walk due to lathyrism, surrounded by starving people waiting for bowls of grass pea-based food.

=== Valencia and Aragon ===
A type of gachas made with corn flour are popular in the area of Ademuz, in the comarca of Rincón de Ademuz, a Valencian enclave in the eastern fringes of the ancient New Castile. These gachas are generally mixed with pork or cod, as well as tomatoes and snails. The dish is part of the traditional cuisine of the area, in addition to the grass pea gachas of neighboring La Mancha that are eaten in Ademuz as well. In the Valencian Ports mountain region further northeast, a similar dish is known locally as farro.

In Aragon the same dish may be also called gachas, but more often it is referred to by the local name of farinetas. It is prepared by frying thick pieces of bacon in olive oil and taking them off the pan when they have released some fat. Then water and fine corn flour are added to the same pan, slowly stirring the mixture until it is cooked. The proportion is roughly 250 g of flour, 150 g of bacon, 1 liter of water, three large spoonfuls of extra virgin olive oil and a teaspoonful of salt.

== Gachas as a dessert ==
It is common in Andalusia to prepare Gachas dulces (sweet gachas), a sweet version of the dish which can be served as a dessert. The ingredients are olive oil, flour and water, like in the traditional gachas, but adding sugar instead of garlic and salt. They may be cooked with milk instead of water. Sweet gachas may be seasoned with honey, vanilla, orange peel and cinnamon. The dish may be eaten with raisins, almonds or bread croutons.

The gachas extremeñas (also known as "puchas dulces") are a dessert from Extremadura flavored with anise (Pimpinella anisum). In this dish breadcrumbs are added to the mixture during cooking.

== See also ==
- Gachas migas
- List of porridges
- List of Spanish dishes
