= Escalivada =

Catalan traditional smoky grilled vegetable dish

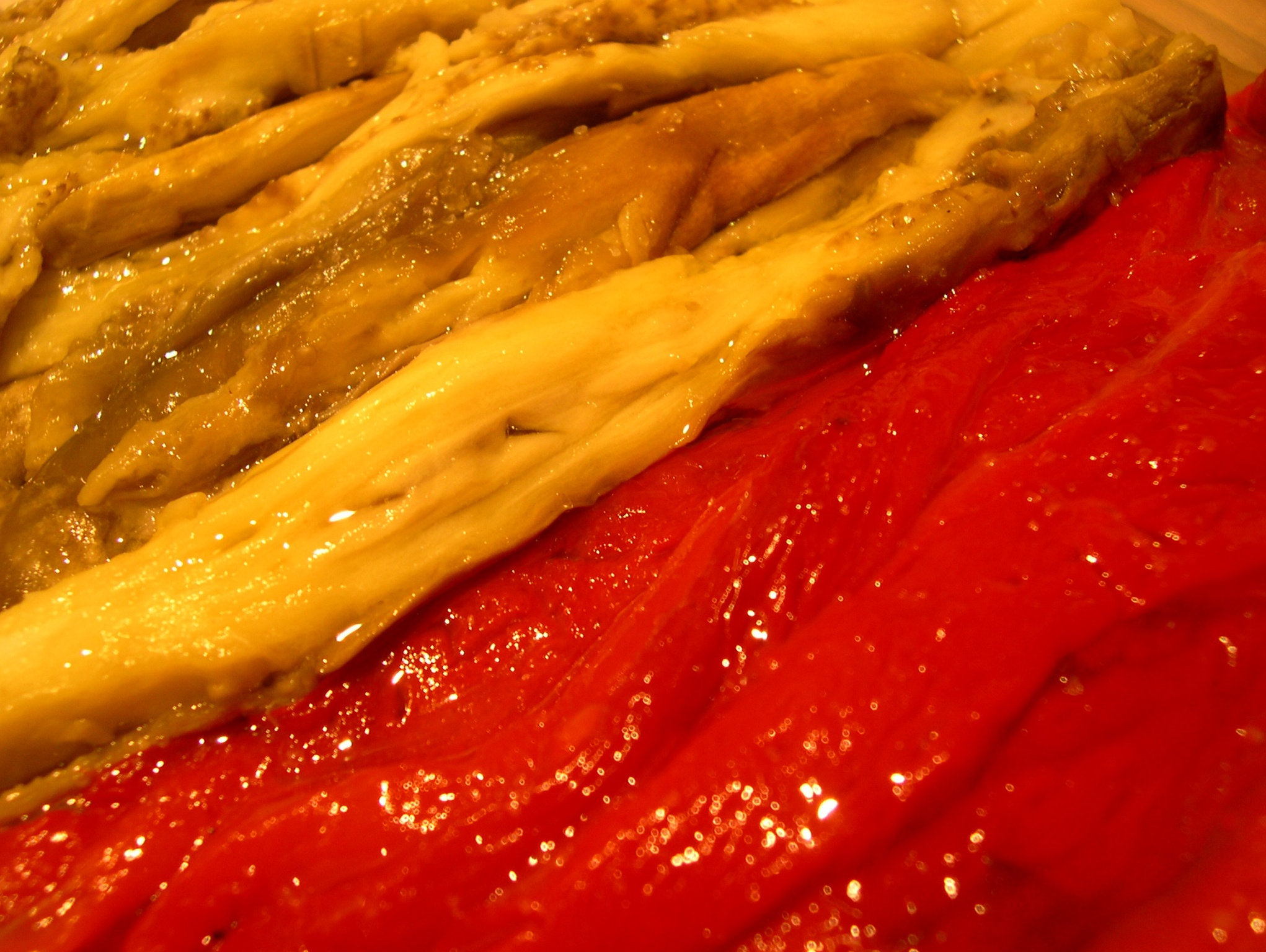
- Alternative names: Escalibada
- Place of origin: France, Spain
- Region or state: Catalan Countries
- Main ingredients: Eggplants, bell peppers, onions, tomatoes, olive oil

Escalivada (Catalan pronunciation: [əskəliˈβaðə]; Spanish pronunciation: [eskaliˈβaða]), also sometimes transcribed in French as 'escalibade' and in Spanish as escalibada, is a traditional dish from Roussillon, Catalonia, València, Murcia and Aragón of smoky grilled vegetables. It typically consists of roasted eggplant and bell peppers with olive oil and sometimes onion, tomato, minced garlic, and salt.

The name comes from the Catalan verb escalivar, "to cook in ashes", referencing the dish's traditional preparation in the embers of a wood fire.

The dish can be grilled outdoors on a grate until charred and soft or may be cooked whole directly on glowing coals and then peeled. Indoors, the eggplant may be charred on a gas burner and the rest of the vegetables may be broiled. Escalivada is often seen as a relish for grilled meats or fish such as tuna, with anchovies or olives in a salad, or as a topping for coca (Catalan flat bread, somewhat similar to a pizza). It is also a common side for pa amb tomàquet (bread with tomato) or truita de patates (potato omelet), often served in typical Catalan households.
