= Tomate frito =

Pureed tomato sauce with onion and garlic

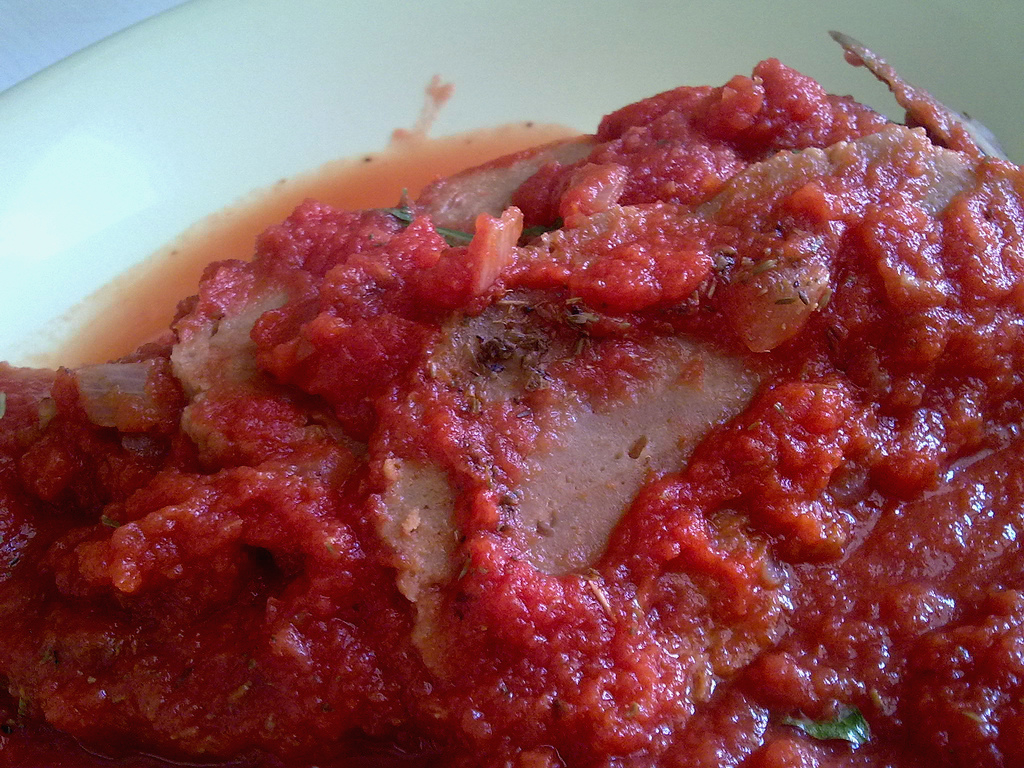
Seitan with tomate frito

Tomate frito (lit. 'fried tomato') is a pureed tomato sauce with a hint of onion and garlic, that can be used as a base ingredient or enjoyed simply for its own flavour. It is distinct from most tomato sauces because the tomatoes have been fried, and its ingredients include a small amount of vegetable oil. It is the most common tomato ingredient of Spanish cuisine other than fresh tomatoes, and is sold under many brand names. When made by first frying garlic and onion pieces in oil with spices and then adding the tomato puree, it is known as sofrito.
