= Patatas bravas =

Spanish potato dish

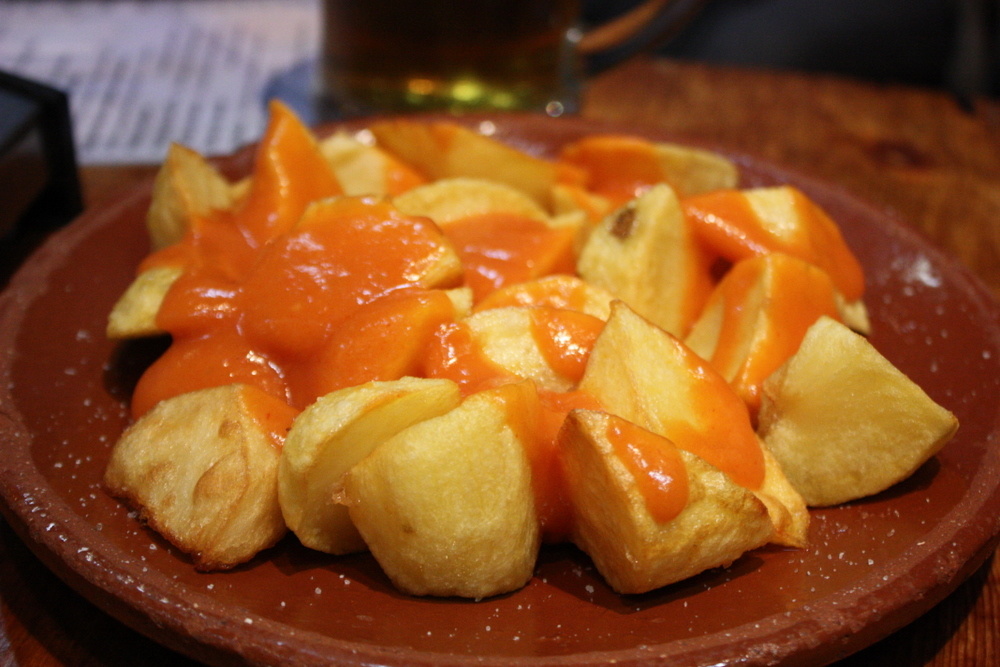
- A plate of patatas bravas
- Place of origin: Spain
- Serving temperature: hot
- Main ingredients: Potato, several sauces

Patatas bravas (Spanish: [paˈtatas ˈβɾaβas], also called patatas a la brava or papas bravas, all meaning "spicy potatoes") is a dish native to Spain. It typically consists of white potatoes that have been cut into two-centimeter-wide (3/4-inch) cubes, then fried in oil and served hot with a spicy "brava" sauce. The brava sauce is primarily sweet or smoked paprika (using high-quality Spanish pimentón de la Vera and olive-oil-based, often thickened with cornstarch. Some regions call for the addition of tomato paste, although there can be many variations.

The dish is commonly served in restaurants and bars throughout Spain as a variety of tapas.

== Consumption ==
Patatas bravas are served in bars in servings that contain approximately one-quarter kilogram (1/2 lb) of potatoes. It is frequently consumed as part of tapas.

The sauce for patatas bravas is also sometimes served over mussels. This dish is known as mejillones en salsa brava.

== See also ==
- French fries
- Potato chip
- Papas arrugadas
- List of potato dishes
- Patatas a lo pobre
