= Tapas =

Appetiser or snack in Spanish and international cuisine

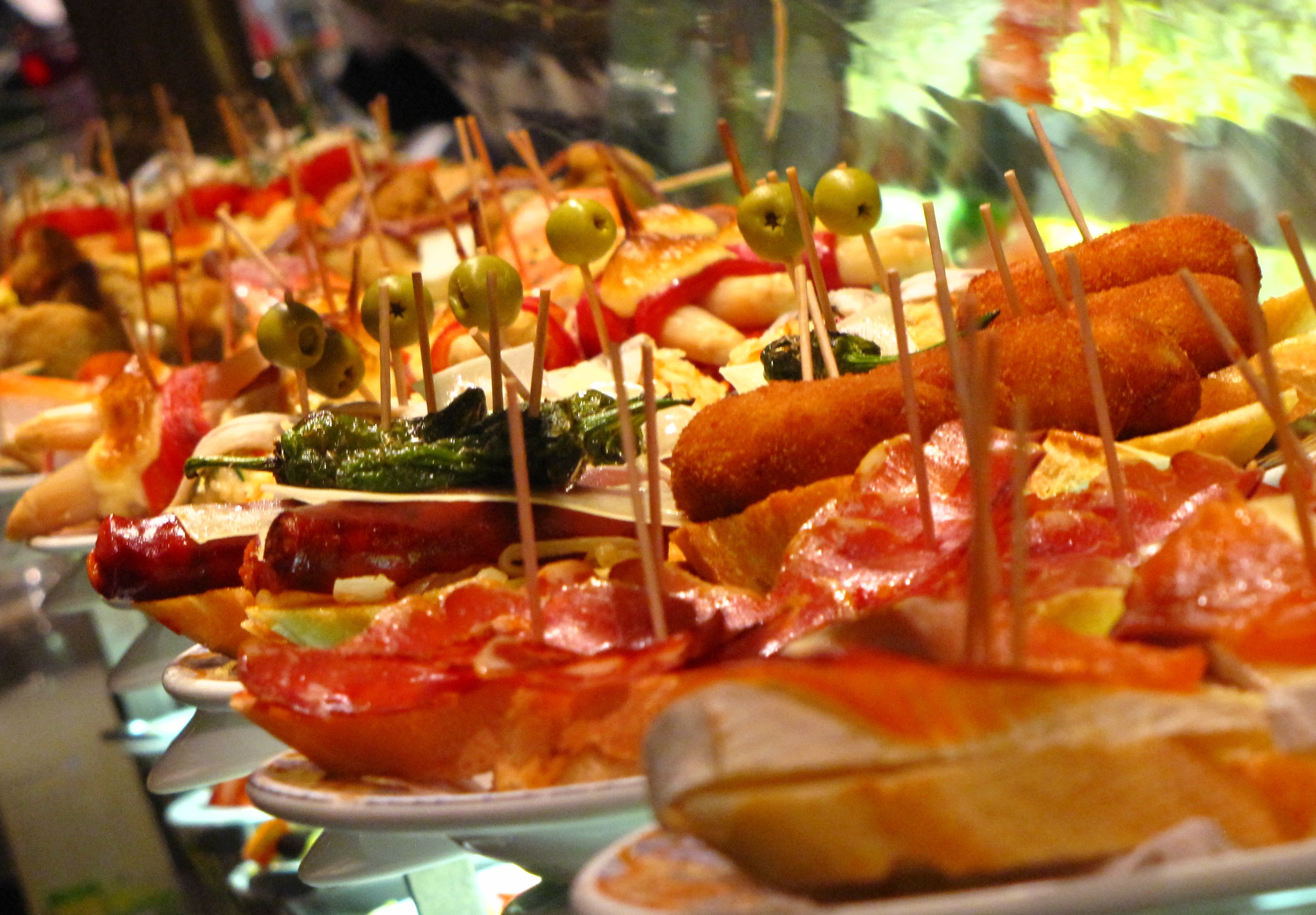
- Tapas in Barcelona
- Course: Appetiser or snack
- Place of origin: Spain
- Serving temperature: Hot or cold
- Main ingredients: Various

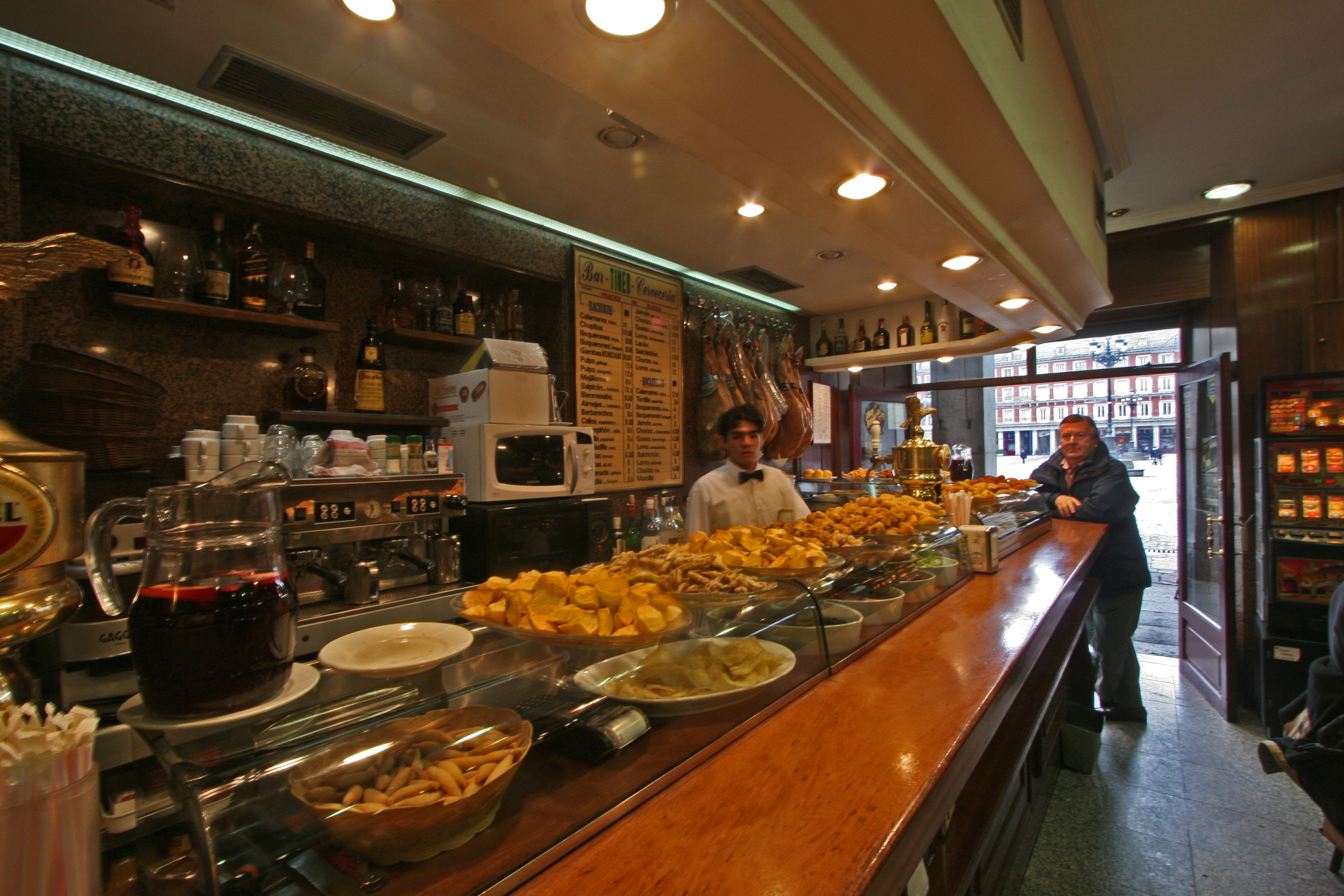
Tapas bar and restaurant at Plaza Mayor, in Madrid

Tapas (Spanish: [ˈtapa]) are appetisers or snacks in Spanish cuisine. They can be combined to make a full meal and are served cold (such as mixed olives and cheese) or hot (such as chopitos, which are battered, fried baby squid; or patatas bravas, spicy potatoes). In some bars and restaurants in Spain and across the globe, tapas have evolved into sophisticated cuisine. In some Central American countries, such snacks are known as bocas. In parts of Mexico, similar dishes are called botanas.

An individual appetizer (or single order of an item) is a tapa.

== History ==
The word "tapas", a plural, is derived from the Spanish verb tapar, "to cover". There are multiple theories about the origin of the use of the term for appetizers.

Tapas have evolved through Spanish history by incorporating new ingredients and influences. Most of the Iberian Peninsula was invaded by the Romans in 218 B.C., who introduced more extensive cultivation of the olive and irrigation methods following their arrival. The discovery of the New World brought the introduction of tomatoes, sweet and chili peppers, maize (corn), and potatoes, which were readily accepted and easily grown in Spain's microclimates.

There are many tapas competitions throughout Spain. Beginning in 2005 the city of Valladolid in Northwest Spain has hosted a national tapas competition each November. Interest in this event outside of Spain spurred the City of Valladolid to hold an International Tapas Competition for Culinary Schools, starting in 2009. Various schools from around the world come to Spain annually to compete in it for the best tapa concept. The international competition was initially aimed at students from culinary schools around the world. In 2017, this format gave way to the World Tapas Competition, conceived as a competition for professional chefs representing different countries. The competition now brings together 16 finalists from around the world in Valladolid. The field consists of international finalists from qualifying events held in countries and regions around the world and the winner of the previous year's Spanish National Tapas Competition. The 2018 winner was Shuyun Chen from New Zealand. The World Tapas Competition awards €10,000 to the winner, €5,000 to the runner-up and €2,500 to the third-placed chef.

== Origin ==
Though the primary meaning of tapa is cover or lid, in Spain it has also become a term for this style of appetiser. The origin of this meaning and style of food is uncertain, but there are several theories purporting to explain it.

The tapas tradition may have begun when King Alfonso X of Castile (1221–1284) recovered from an illness by drinking wine with small dishes between meals. After regaining his health, the king ordered that taverns would not be allowed to serve wine to customers unless it was accompanied by a small snack or "tapa".

Another popular and more modern explanation says that King Alfonso XIII (1886–1941) stopped by a famous tavern in Cádiz (an Andalusian city) where he ordered a glass of wine. The waiter covered the glass with a slice of cured ham before offering it to the king, in order to protect the wine from the blowing beach sand, as Cádiz is a windy place. The king, after drinking the wine and eating the ham, ordered another wine con la tapa ("with the cover"). The popular American cookbook Joy of Cooking offers a similar explanation, but in this version the meat was used by sherry drinkers in Andalusian taverns to prevent fruit flies from hovering over their sherry. The meat used was normally ham or chorizo, which are both very salty and activate thirst. Because of this, bartenders and restaurant owners created a variety of snacks to serve with sherry, thus increasing their alcohol sales. The tapas eventually became as important as the sherry.

A third theory holds that in pre-19th-century Spain few innkeepers at posadas, albergues or bodegas offering meals and rooms for travellers could write but few travellers could read, so guests were offered a sample of the dishes available on a "tapa" (“pot cover” in Spanish).

It has also been claimed that tapas originated in the south of Spain during the time of the Spanish Inquisition as a means of publicly identifying conversos, Jews who had converted to Christianity. Since tapas often consist in part of ham or other non-kosher foodstuffs, the reluctance of the conversos to eat whatever tapas dish was offered to them could be taken as a tacit admission that they had not abandoned their Jewish faith.

== See also ==
- List of tapas
- List of hors d'oeuvre
- Cicchetti – Small snacks or side dishes in Venetian cuisine
- Meze – Small dish in Middle Eastern and Balkan cuisines
- Pincho – Small snack in northern Spain
- Pusas – Traditional appetiser or snack eaten with alcohol in Sabah, Malaysia
- Sakana – Japanese snacks, eaten with alcohol
- Zakuski – Russian term for appetizers served before meals
