= Cuisine of the Community of Madrid =

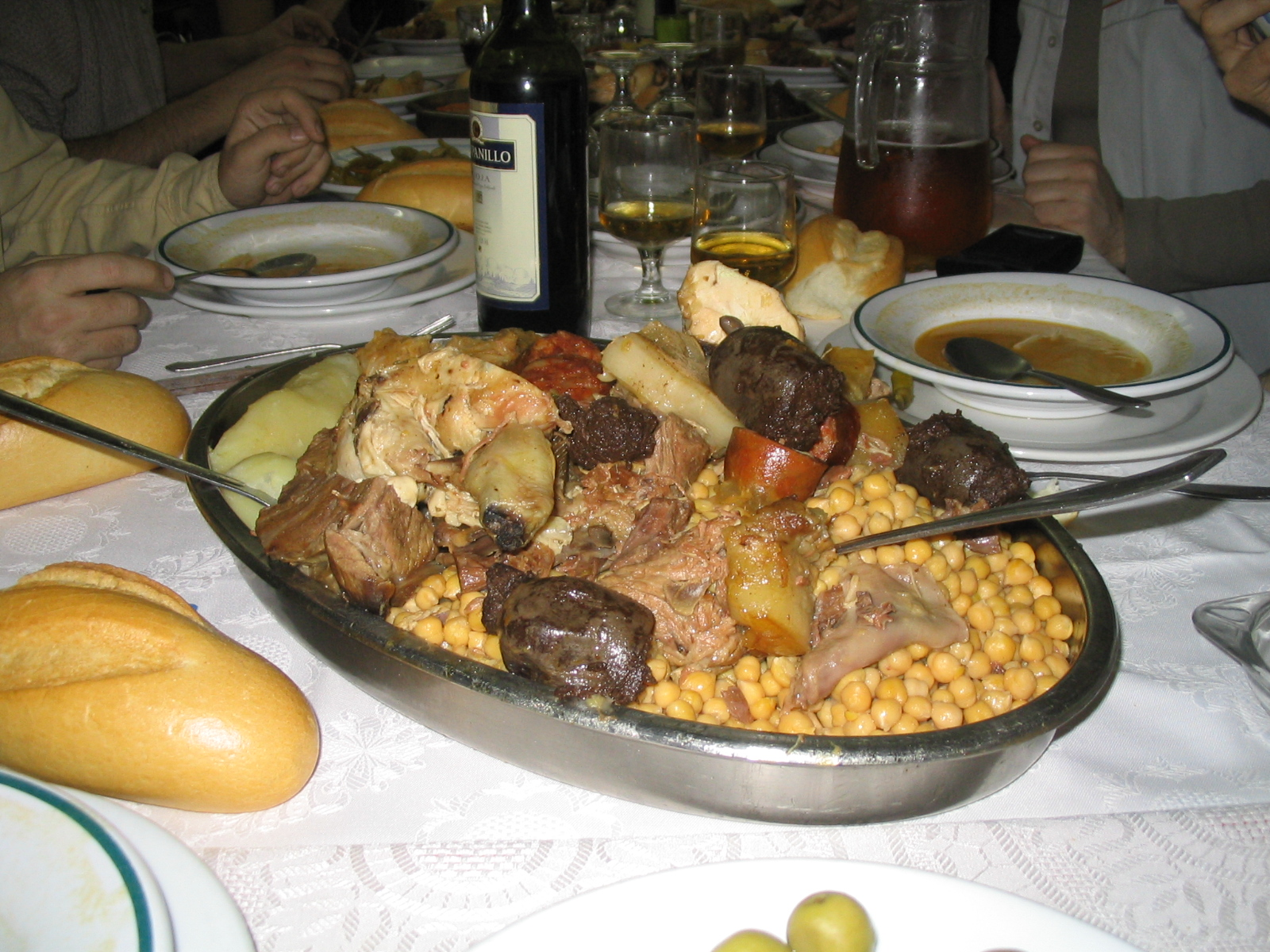
Platter of cocido madrileño, a traditional and emblematic part of Madrid cuisine, featuring two of three traditional servings

The cuisine of the Community of Madrid is an amalgamation of the cuisines of various regions of Spain developed, in part, by mass migration to the capital city starting during the reign of King Felipe II. As the city grew, it incorporated the culinary traditions of the municipalities it absorbed into the area now known as the Community of Madrid.

The smell of local cooking is frequently compared to that of food fried in vegetable oil: churros, calamares a la romana, tortilla de patatas, bocadillos de calamares, patatas bravas, chopitos, gallinejas, among other traditional dishes.

== History ==
The culinary history of Madrid began at the end of the 16th century, when King Felipe II established Madrid as the capital city of his kingdom. From this point forward, people from all parts of the Spanish Empire came to the city, bringing with them their customs and traditions. Some of the most notable local inns were established during these early centuries of development: Posada de la Villa in 1624 and Casa Botín in 1725.

One of the earliest restaurants is the Lhardy, which opened its doors in 1839, which prompted the establishment of similar locales. In 1873, entrepreneur Matias Lacasa arrived from Vienna and decided to open a bakery to sell his patented pastry pan de viena. His establishment grew to become the base of the Viena Capellanes chain of pastry shops.

Today, Madrid is home to many restaurants, offering both regional Spanish dishes and international cuisine. An international culinary destination, Madrid is lauded by its foreign visitors, whose only complaint is the Spanish schedule for meals. As in much of Spain since the Francoist era, dinner is served between two and four in the afternoon, and a light supper is consumed after ten at night.

== Typical dishes ==
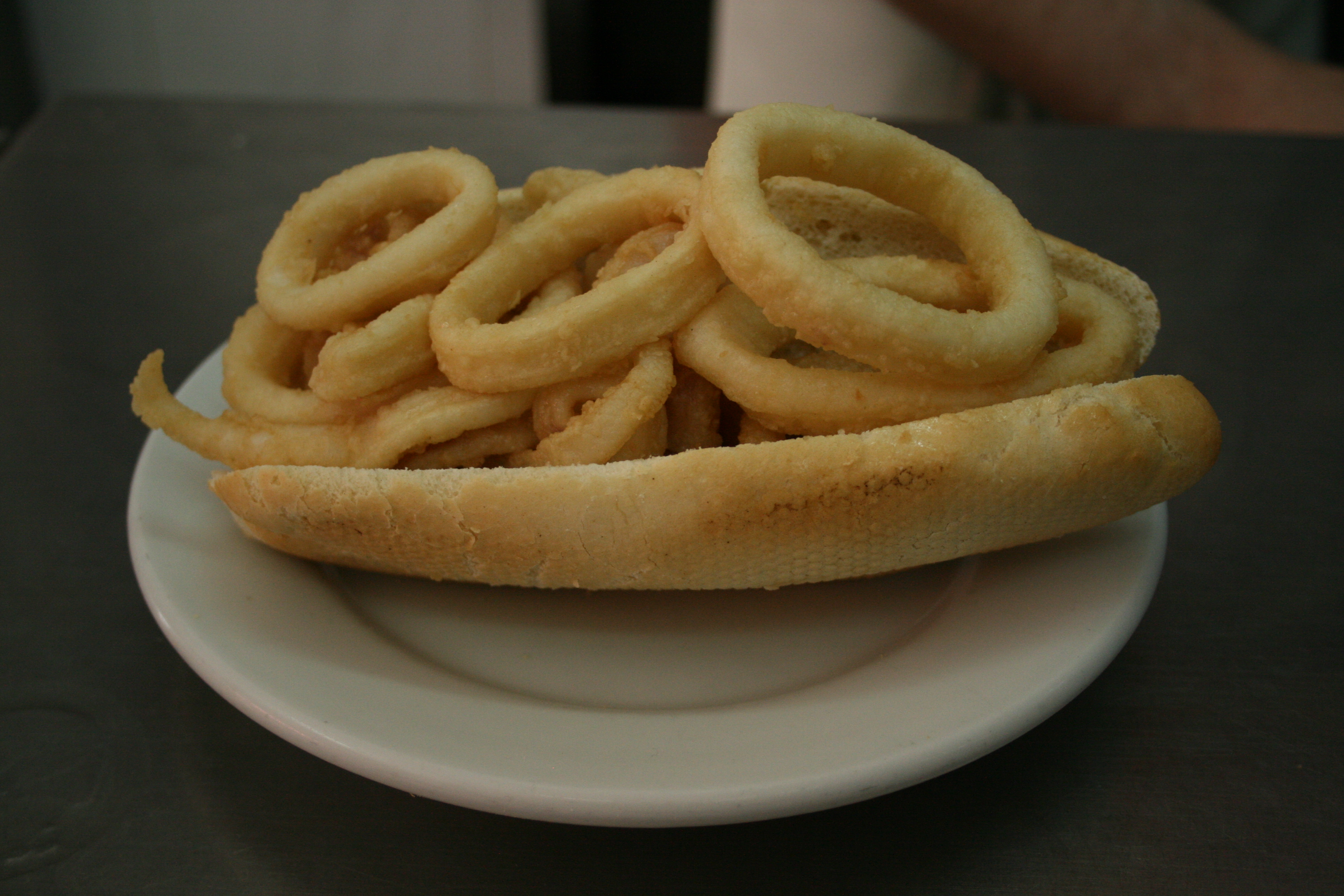
A bocadillo de calamares.

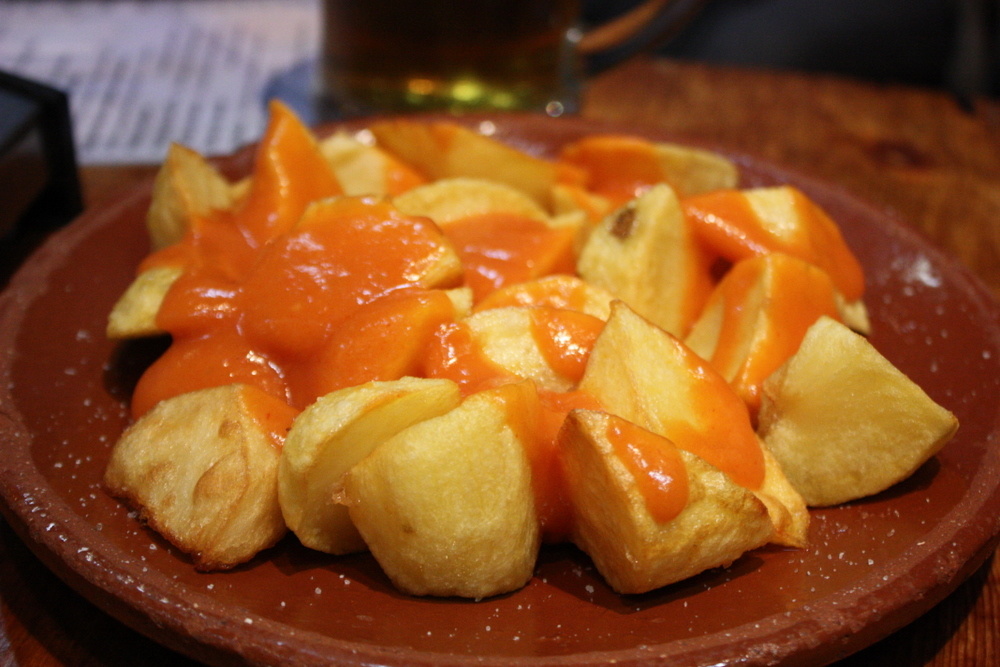
A plate of patatas bravas.

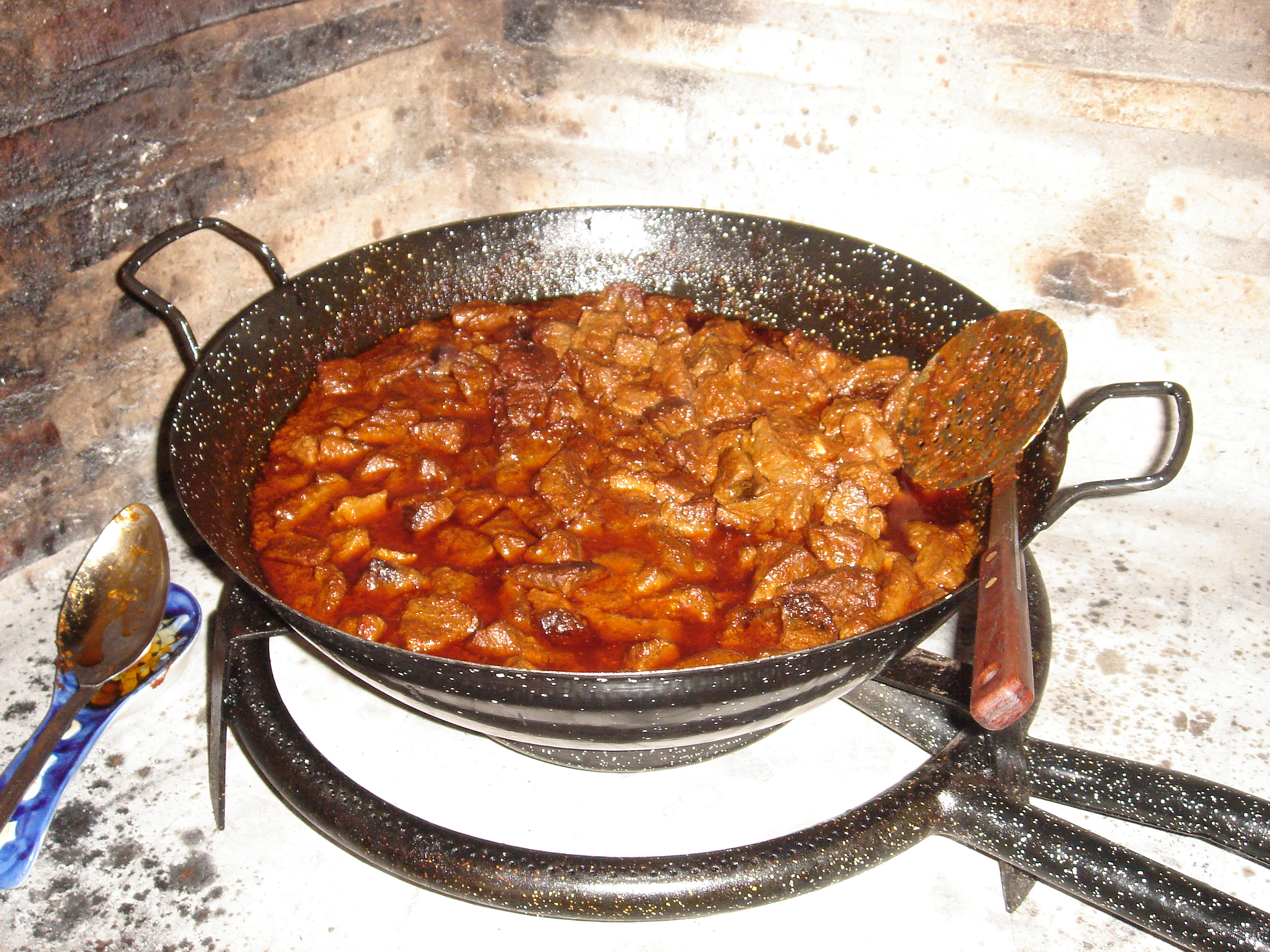
A skillet of carne al desarreglo (beef stew).

Eating tapas is common in Madrid. This is the practice of visiting several bars and ordering a number of small, varied dishes which are then shared among the people in the group. Many of the same local dishes available as tapas can also be ordered in regular servings at sit-down restaurants.

Some of typical local dishes include:

- Cocido madrileño: A popular beef and vegetable stew that is frequently offered as a Tuesday special. Consisting of chickpeas (Cicer arietinum), meat (usually beef), vegetables, and sausage, the dish is served in three courses. The first course consists of a broth-based soup, the second includes beans and vegetables, and the final course contains meat and sausage.
- Callos a la madrileña: A local variation of the Asturian dish, this tripe-based dish is made with chorizo, blood sausage, the hoof and snout of a cow, sweet paprika, and the tripe of a calf or lamb.
- Oreja a la plancha: Literally "grilled ear," this common pork dish is an acquired taste, and exists in a number of forms: with garlic (al ajillo), with spicy sauce, in the Basque style (a la vizcaína), etc.
- Gallinejas: A popular dish consisting of fried sheep entrails.
- Gambas al ajillo and setas al ajillo: Literally "prawns with garlic" and "mushrooms with garlic", these dishes are served piping hot and are popular appetizers for the midday meal.
- Bocadillo de calamares: A bocadillo of fried squid rings that can be ordered in practically every bar.
- Patatas bravas: A very common dish consisting of irregularly-cut fried potatoes covered in a spicy tomato sauce.
- Soldaditos de Pavía: Strips of unsalted bacalao which are battered and fried.
- Caracoles a la madrileña: A tapa consisting of snails cooked in a spicy sauce.
- Besugo a la madrileña: A traditional dish of baked sea bream.
- Carne al desarreglo: Beef stew.
- Huevos estrellados: A dish of eggs fried in olive oil served with fried potatoes (e.g. diced or sliced, French fries or potato chips) and often a sliced meat (usually ham or bacon) or sausage (typically chorizo or chistorra).

== Desserts ==
Madrid is renowned for its many types of traditional pastries. Some of the more common include:

- Buñuelos rellenos: A type of stuffed fritter
- Rosquillas tontas y listas: Donuts finished with either a sugary glaze, dry meringue, or almond dust. These famous pastries can usually be found in pastry shops during the month of May and at the end of the Feast of St. Isidore the Laborer
- Huesos de santo: Literally, "bones of the saint", these marzipans are traditionally consumed on All Saints' Day
- Roscón de Reyes
- Torrijas: A kind of fried bread commonly consumed during Holy Week
- Tejas and barquillos: These pastries are commonly sold by street vendors throughout the city.

== Beverages ==
Madrid has its own designation of origin, which is divided into three zones: Arganda, Navalcarnero and San Martín de Valdeiglesias, comprising a total of 22,000 hectares of vineyard.

A popular anisette liquor Anís, made of anise grown in Chinchón, is a typical apéritif.

The traditional leche merengada, a cold cinnamon- and lemon-flavored meringue; and horchata de chufa, horchatas made of chufas original from the Valencian Community, are popular non-alcoholic beverages.

== See also ==
- Sopa de ajo
- Madrilene – Type of clear soup

== Bibliography ==
- Martínez López, M.M. (1998). Historia de la gastronomía española. Madrid, Spain: Alianza Editorial. ISBN 978-84-206-0378-0.
