= Gambas al ajillo =

Spanish shrimp and garlic dish

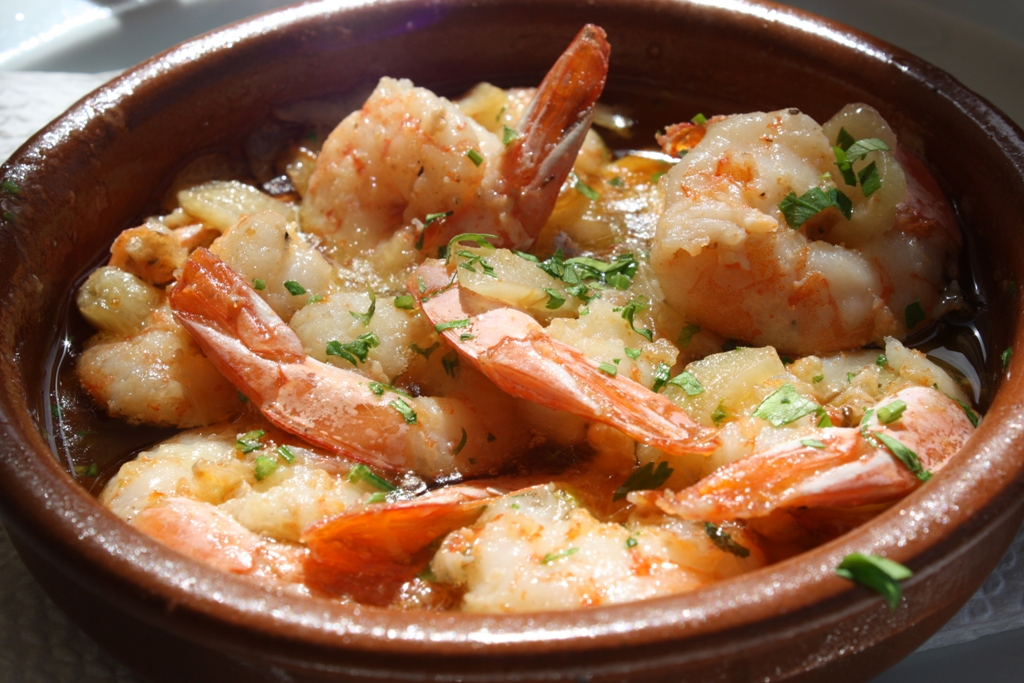
- Gambas al ajillo in a typical cassole.
- Course: Tapas
- Place of origin: Spain
- Associated cuisine: Spanish cuisine
- Main ingredients: Shrimp, garlic, olive oil, peperoncino

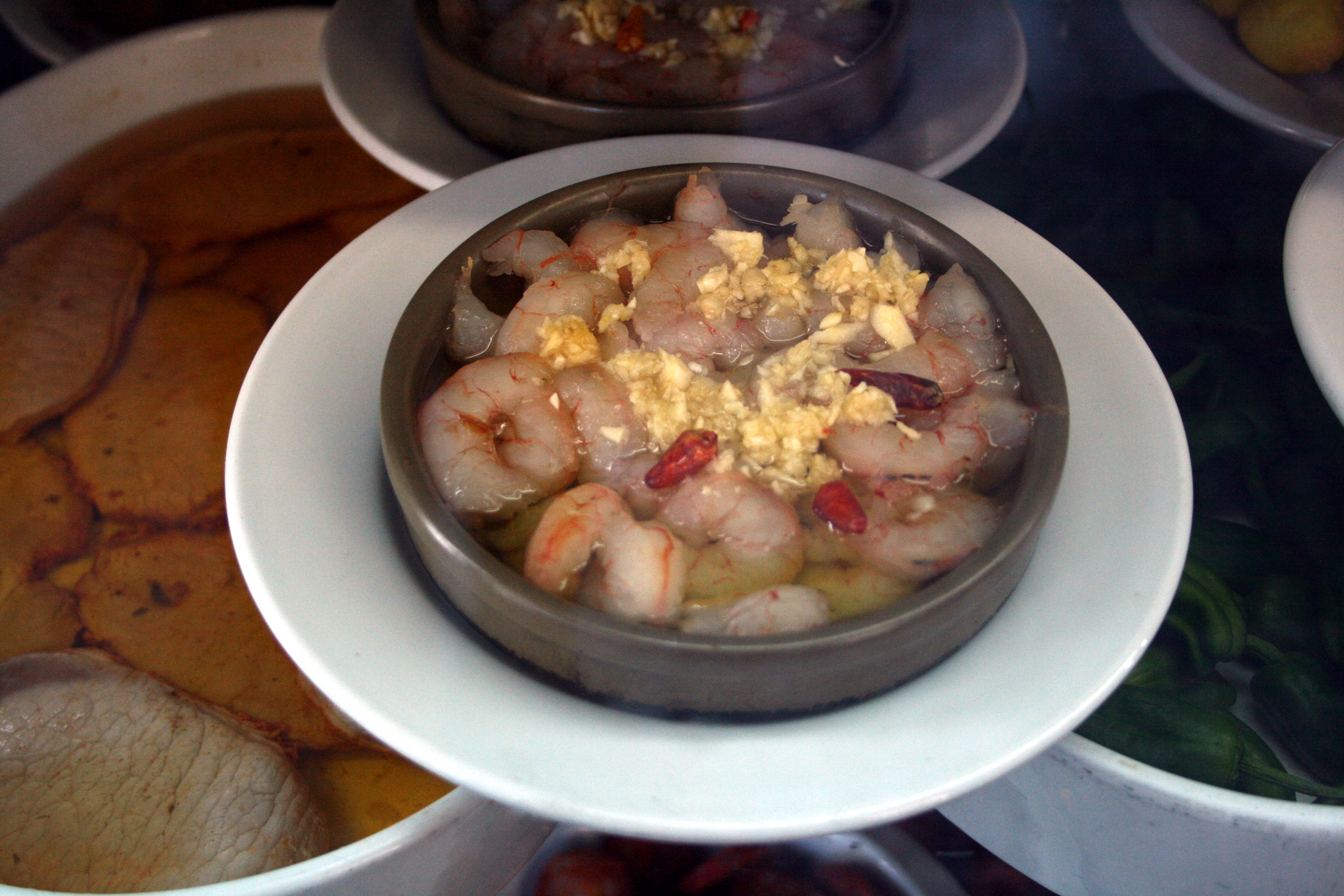
Uncooked gambas al ajillo, ready to be prepared.

Gambas al ajillo (lit. prawn with garlic)—as the dish is known in Spain—is a popular Spanish dish originating in Madrid and is most commonly found in the central and northern regions of the country. The ingredients that make up this dish are peeled shrimp, garlic, and olive oil. It is typically served as a ración (portion) in bars. This dish is a staple of Spanish bar culture.

== Preparation and serving ==
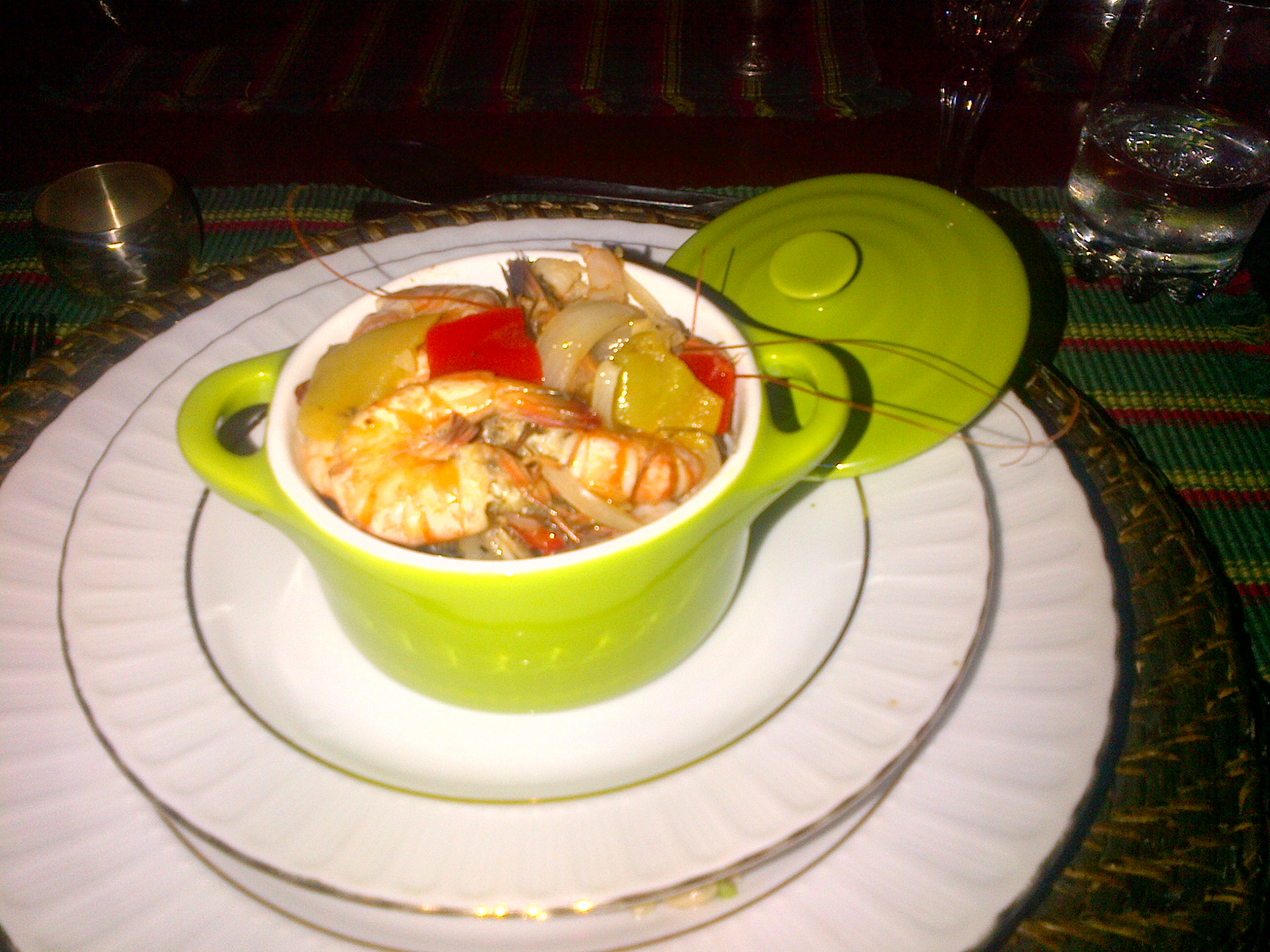
Gambas al ajillo prepared in an individual clay dish, or cassole

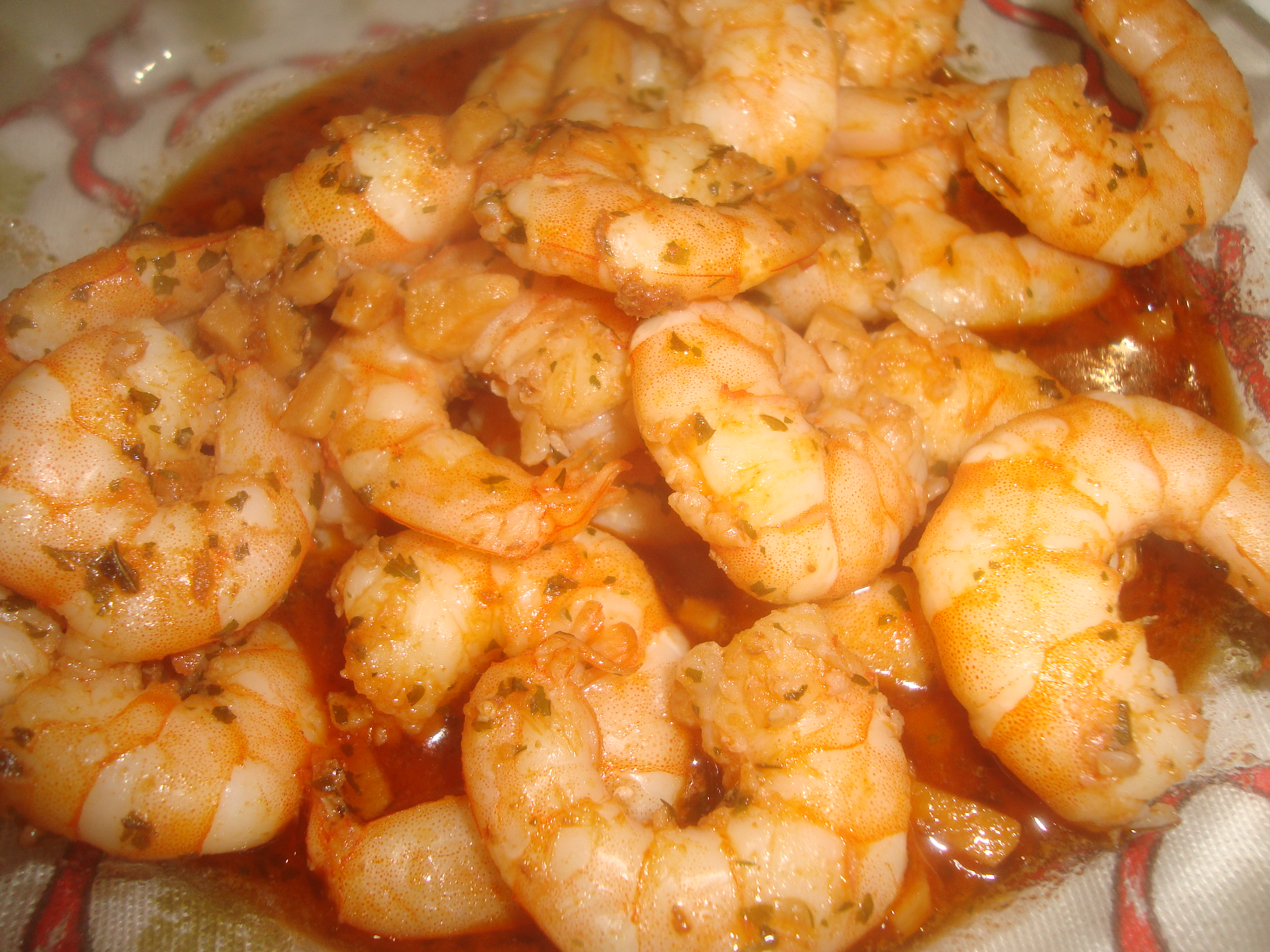
A plate of Gambas al ajillo.

Gambas al ajillo (garlic shrimp) are typically cooked in a cassole (often referred to simply as barro), where garlic and parsley are first fried in olive oil before the shrimp are added at the last moment.

Sometimes, slices of dried chili pepper are included to give the dish a slightly spicy kick. Other variations include a splash of sherry wine. They are usually served straight from the heat source in the clay dish while the oil is still sizzling, sprinkled with a little fresh or dried parsley.

They should be eaten quickly, before they cool down. It is a tapas commonly enjoyed with wine (white, red, or dark red).

== See also ==
- List of shrimp dishes
- Al ajillo, cooking style
- Cuisine of the Community of Madrid
- Karides güveç
