= Bocadillo =

Type of sandwich

bocadillo
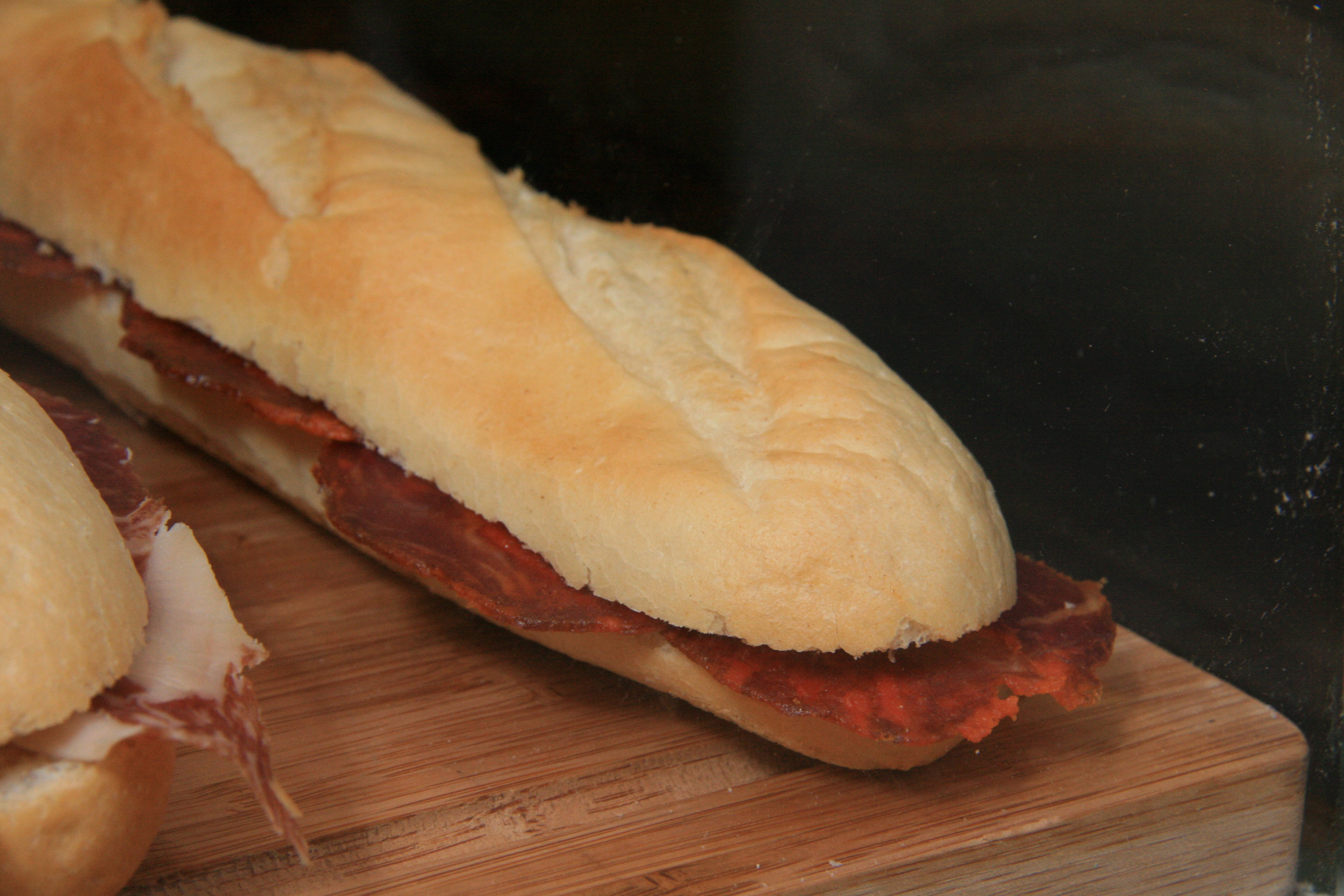
- A bocadillo with chorizo.
- Alternative names: bocata, Basque: otarteko, Catalan: entrepà
- Type: Sandwich
- Place of origin: Spain
- Serving temperature: Cold or baked
- Main ingredients: Spanish bread, cold meat or omelette

The bocadillo (lit. 'small bite') or bocata (in Cheli), in Spain, is a sandwich made with Spanish bread, usually a baguette or similar type of bread, cut lengthwise. Traditionally seen as a humble food, its low cost has allowed it to evolve over time into a representative piece of cuisine. In Spain, they are often eaten in cafes and tapas bars.

Some bocadillos are seasoned with sauces like mayonnaise, aioli, ketchup, mustard or tomato sauce. They are usually served with cold beer or red wine, coffee and a portion of tapas. Different types of bocadillos are available in different parts of Spain, such as the serranito, almussafes and esgarrat.

== Types ==
There is a wide variety of bocadillos in Spain, but the most typical can be pointed out. Bocadillos can also be found in northern Morocco.

Bocadillos

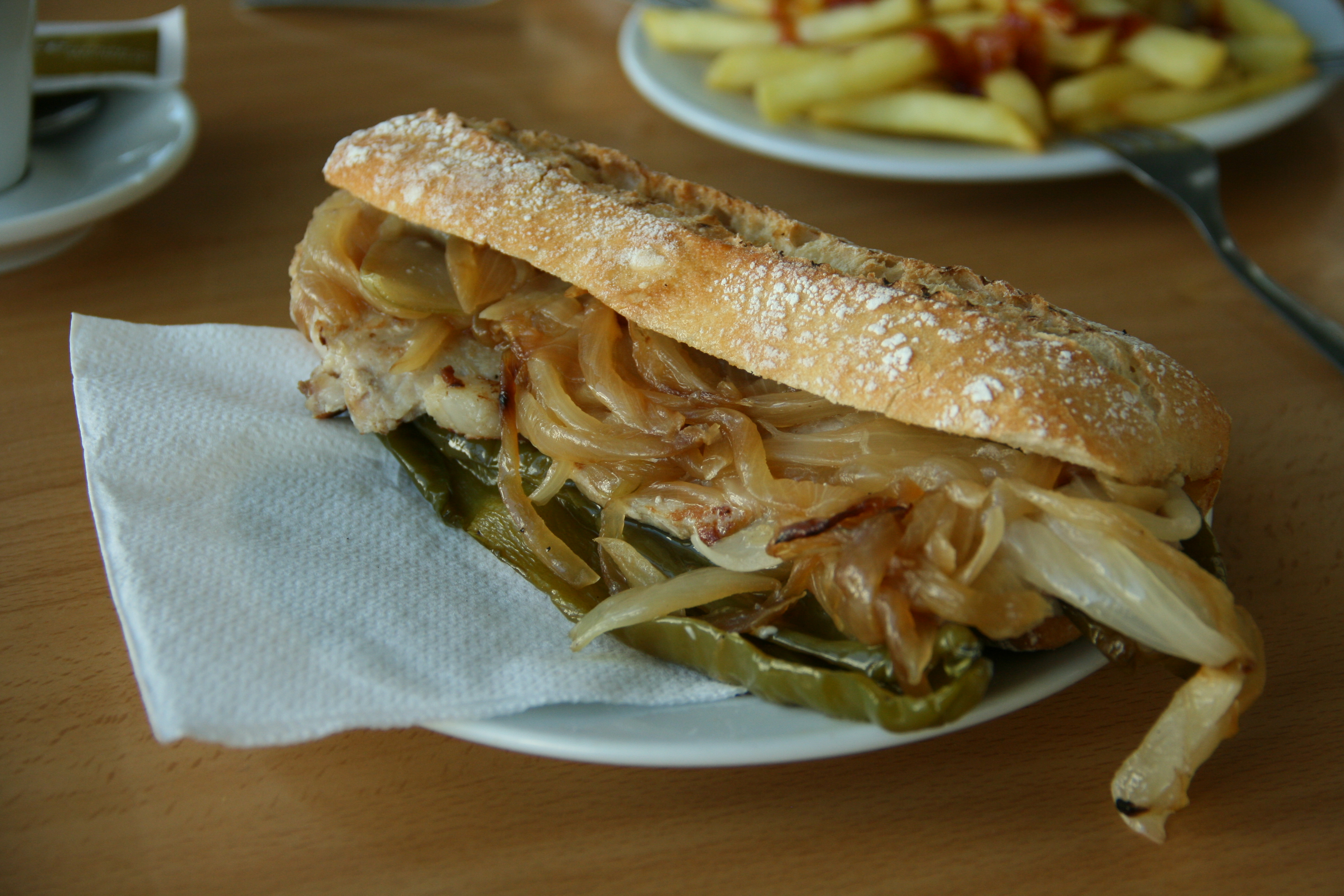
Bocadillo prepared with pork fillet, fried onions and green pepper and seasoned with alioli sauce.

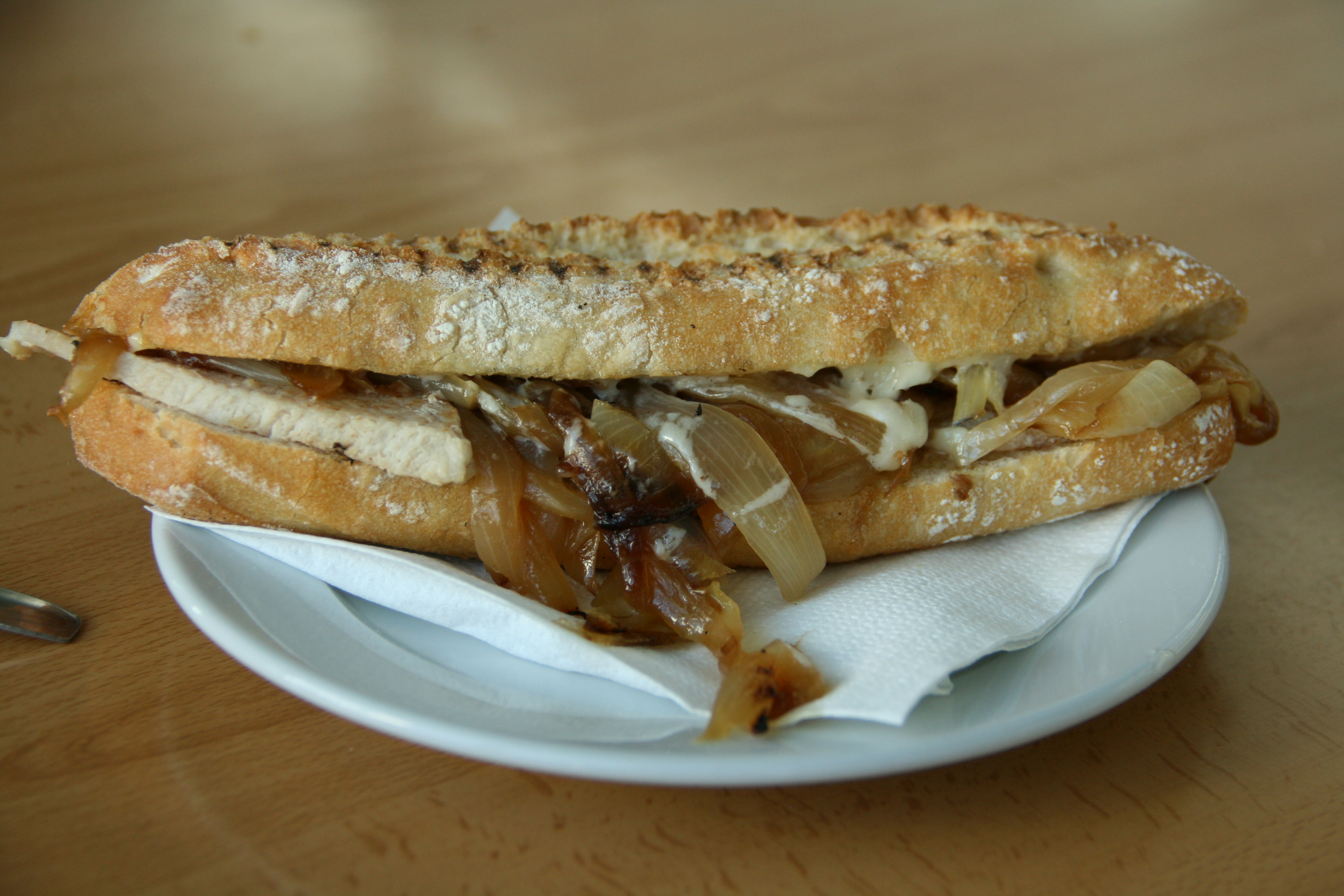
Bocadillo prepared with pork fillet and fried onions and covered in alioli.

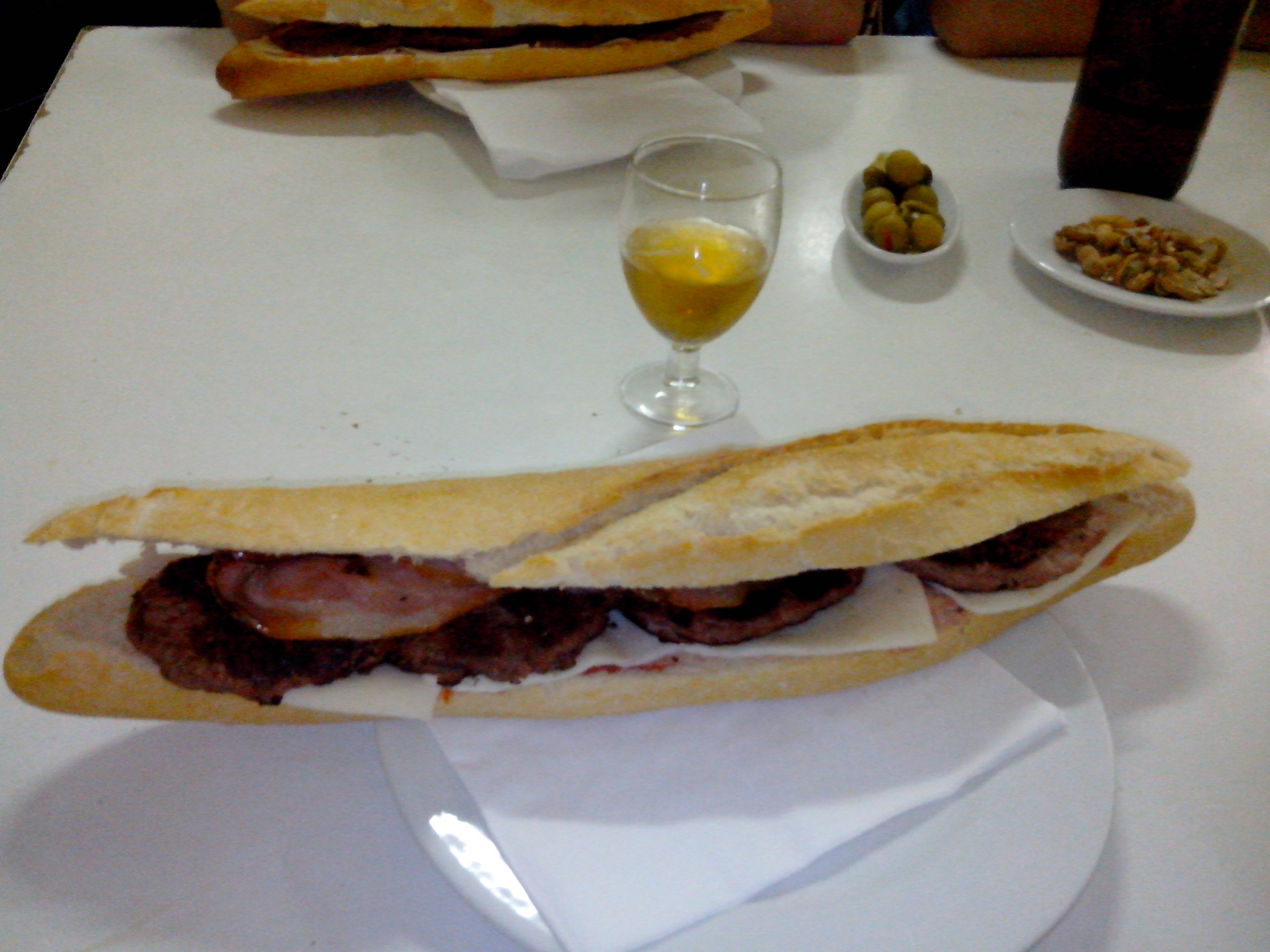
Giant bocadillo of horse meat (four steaks inside).

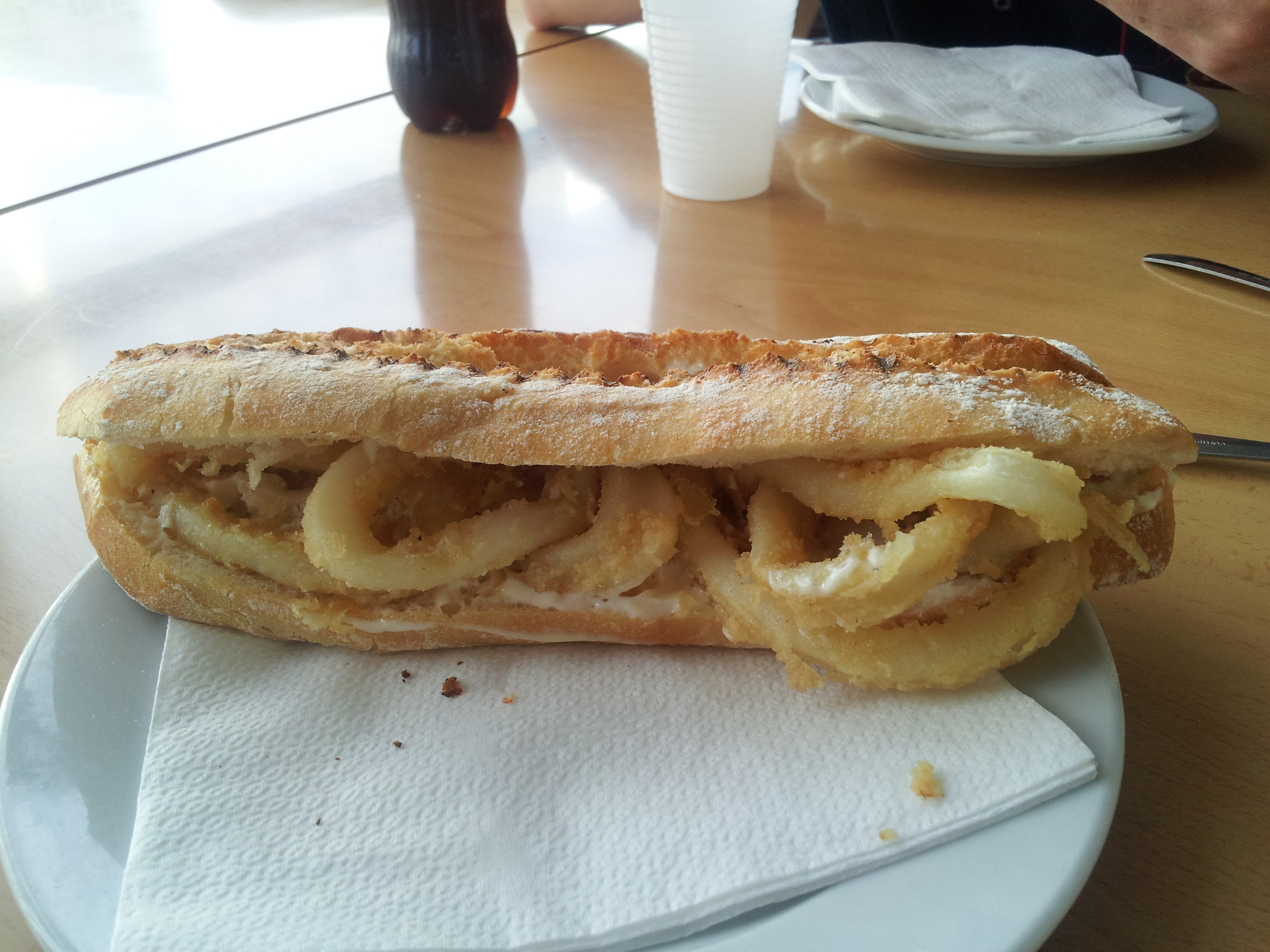
Fried squid with mayonnaise.

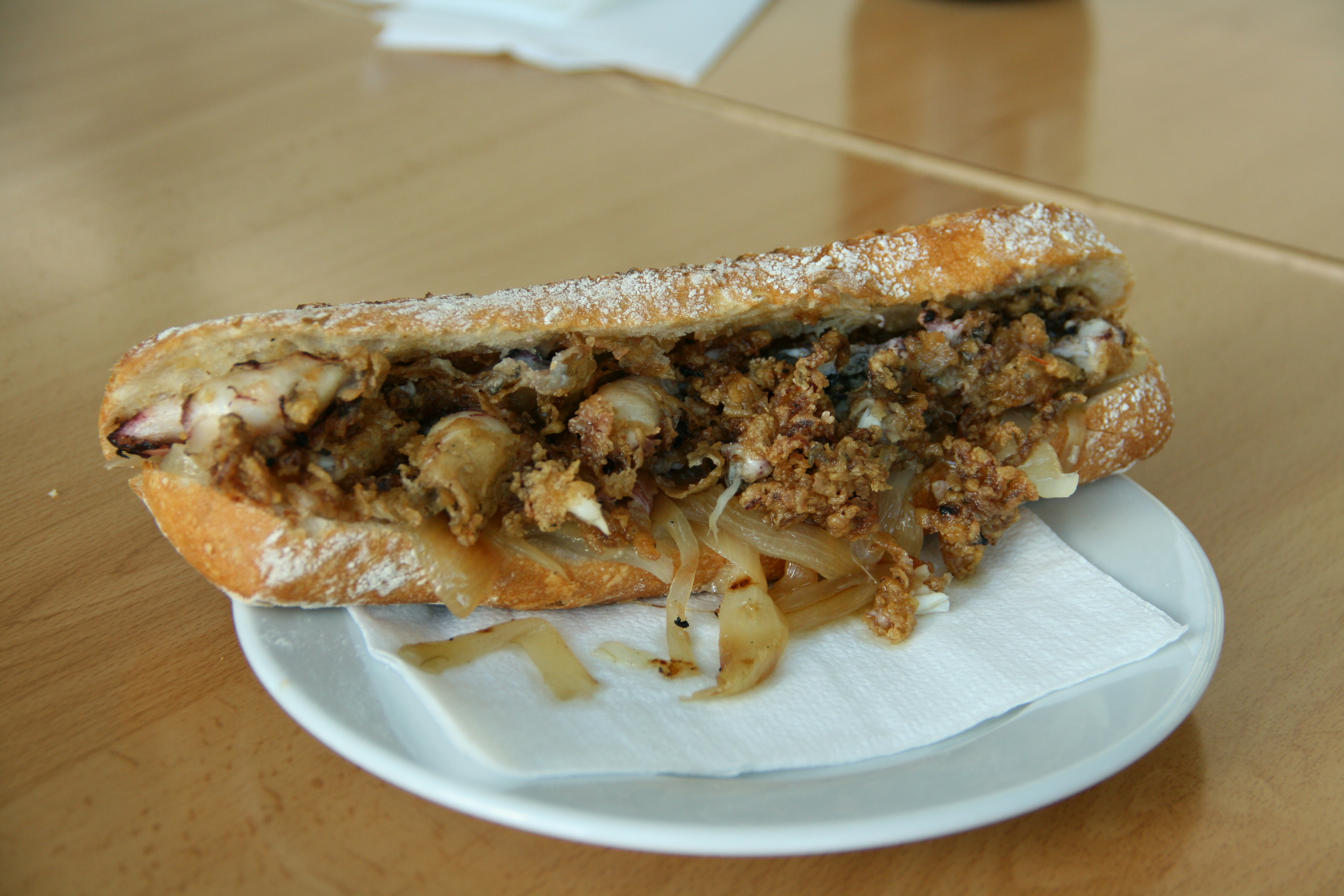
Fried baby squid (puntillas), seasoned with alioli.

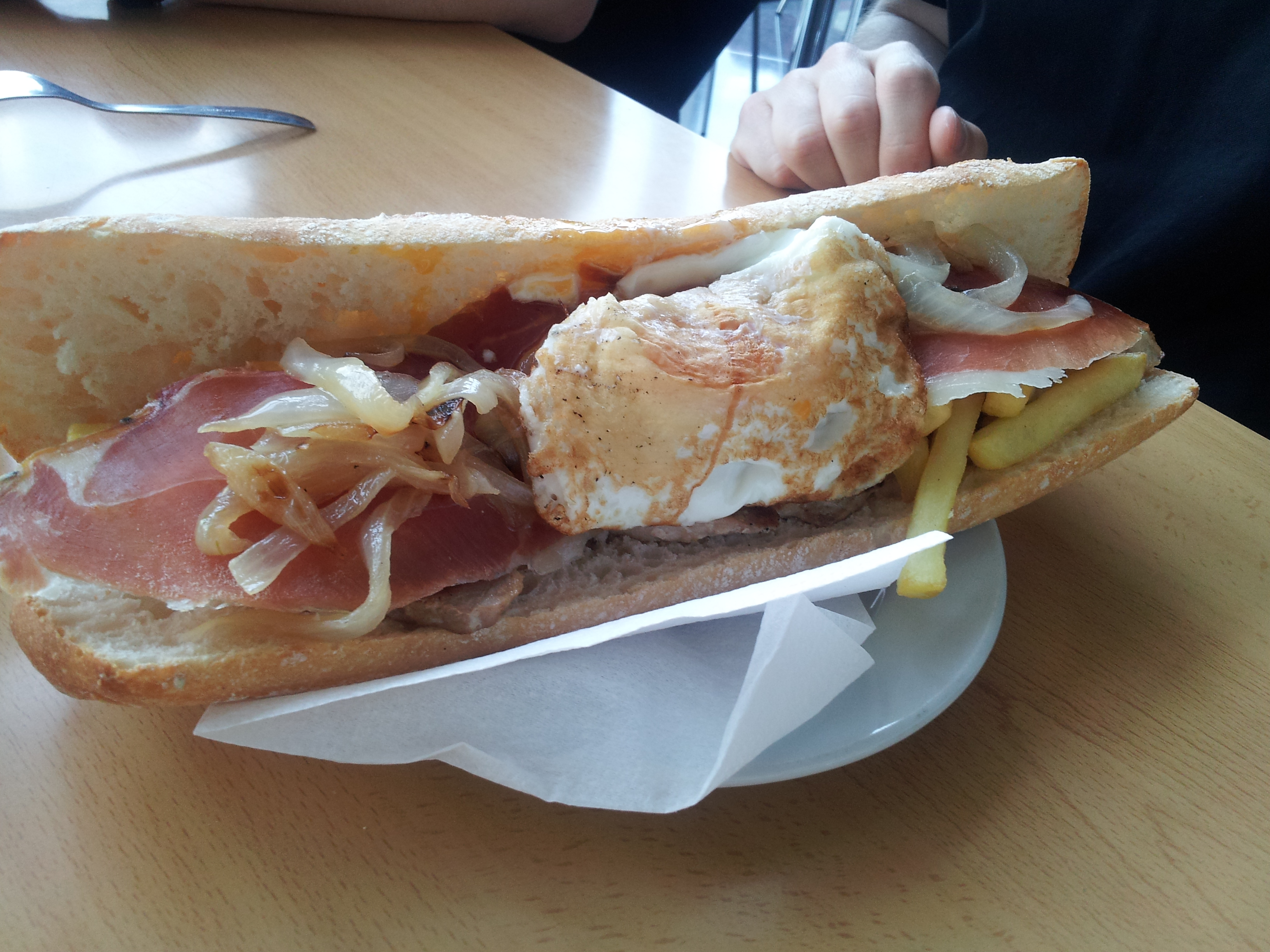
Bocata Kike, with Spanish ham, pork fillet, french fries, fried egg, fried onions and mayonnaise.

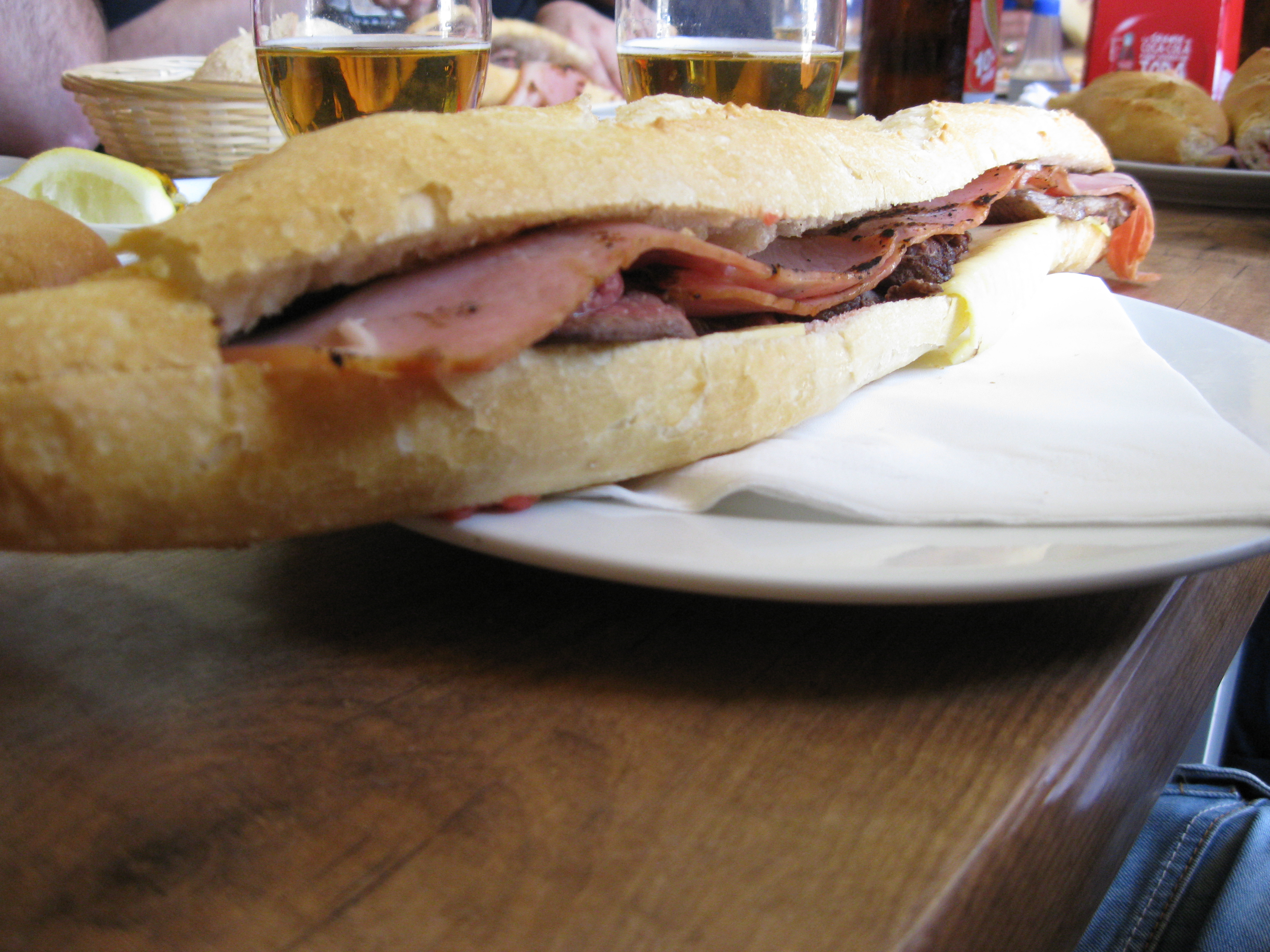
Bocadillo Pascuala Especial, with pork fillet, bacon, cheese and tomato sauce.

=== Omelette ===
- Spanish omelette (prepared with or without onion)
- Campera omelette (prepared with potatoes, green pepper and chorizo)
- Jamon omelette (prepared with jamon instead of using potatoes)
- Cheese omelette
- Courgette omelette
- French omelette
- Garlic omelette (prepared with young garlic, green garlic)
- Bean omelette
- Aubergine omelette
- Spinach omelette
- Tuna fish omelette

=== Cold meat ===
- Jamón - Spanish dry-cured ham, typically served with olive oil
- Boiled ham with cheese
- Bacon with cheese
- Mortadella (with or without olives)
- Salchichón
- Salami
- Paté, Pâté
- Sobrassada with cheese

=== Cheese ===
- Cheese
- Fresh cheese with oil and tomato
- Cheese spread with anchovies
- Sliced Tasmanian feta cheese

=== Vegetarian ===
- Tomato and olive oil, Pa amb tomàquet
- Pisto (prepared with courgette, tomato sauce, green pepper, pine nut)
- Vegetarian (prepared with lettuce, tomato, olives and mayonnaise)

=== Sausage ===
- Chistorra
- Longaniza or blanco (white)
- Chorizo or rojo (red)
- Morcilla or negro (black)
- Blanco y negro (white and black, prepared with longaniza and morcilla)
- Frankfurt

=== Meat ===
- Pork fillet (with green pepper and french fries)
- Horse meat
- Pechuga (Chicken filet)
- Pepito (Beef meat)
- Lamb meat

=== Egg ===
- Fried egg (other ingredient normally accompanied)
- Revuelto de huevos, Scrambled eggs

=== Fish ===
- Calamares, Fried calamares
- Puntillas or Puntillitas (Battered and fried baby squid)
- Calamares en su tinta (Squid stewed in its own black ink)
- Tuna fish with olives
- Sardines
- Cuttlefish
- Smoked salmon with boiled eggs

=== Sweet ===
- Chocolate

=== Other ===
- Brascada (prepared with beef fillet, Spanish ham and fried onions)
- Kike (prepared with pork fillet, Spanish ham, french fries, fried egg, fried onions and mayonnaise)
- Pascuala (prepared with horse fillet, bacon, tomato sauce)
- Pascuala especial (prepared with pork fillet, bacon, cheese and tomato sauce)
- Cofrade
- Chivito
- Emanuele (prepared with chorizo, green pepper, cheese and alioli sauce)
- Spanish Bocadillo (prepared with Spanish omelette, bacon and fresh tomato in slices)
- Portuguese Bocadillo (prepared with pork sausage, fries and green pepper)
- Tumbadito (prepared with turkey fillet, green pepper, cheese and alioli)
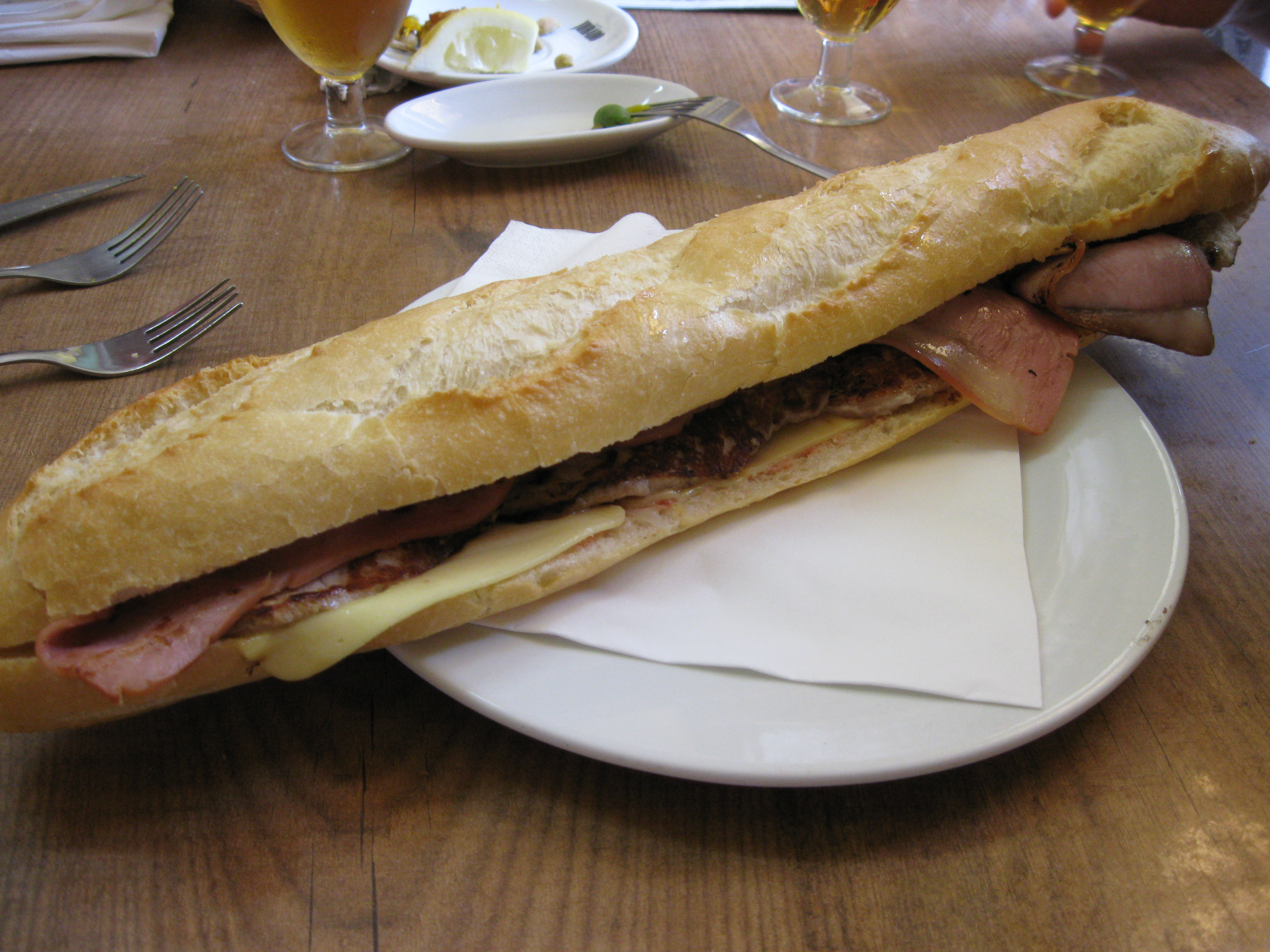
Bocadillo Pascuala

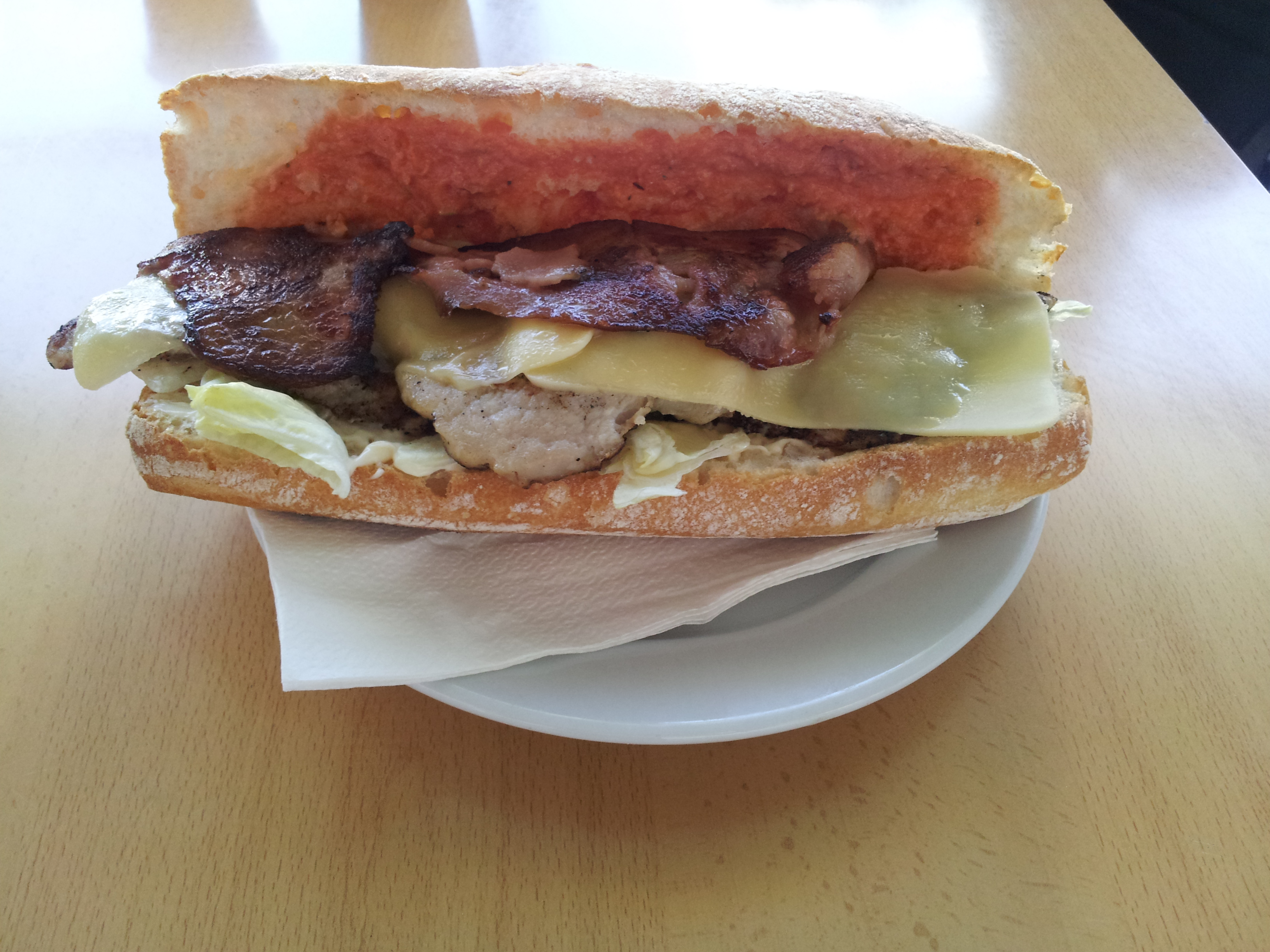
Bocadillo Chivito but using tomato sauce

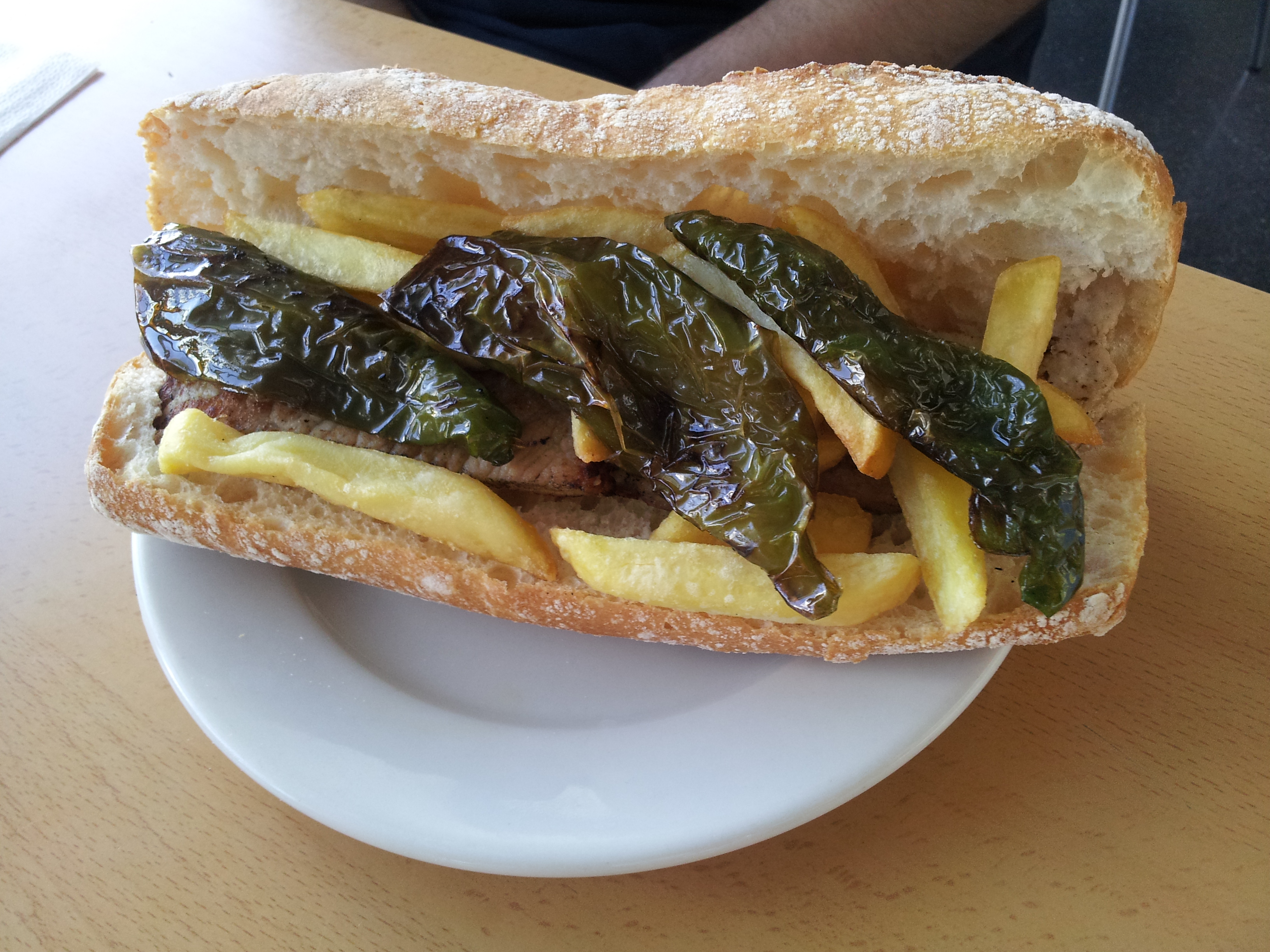
Bocadillo pork fillet with green pepper and french fries

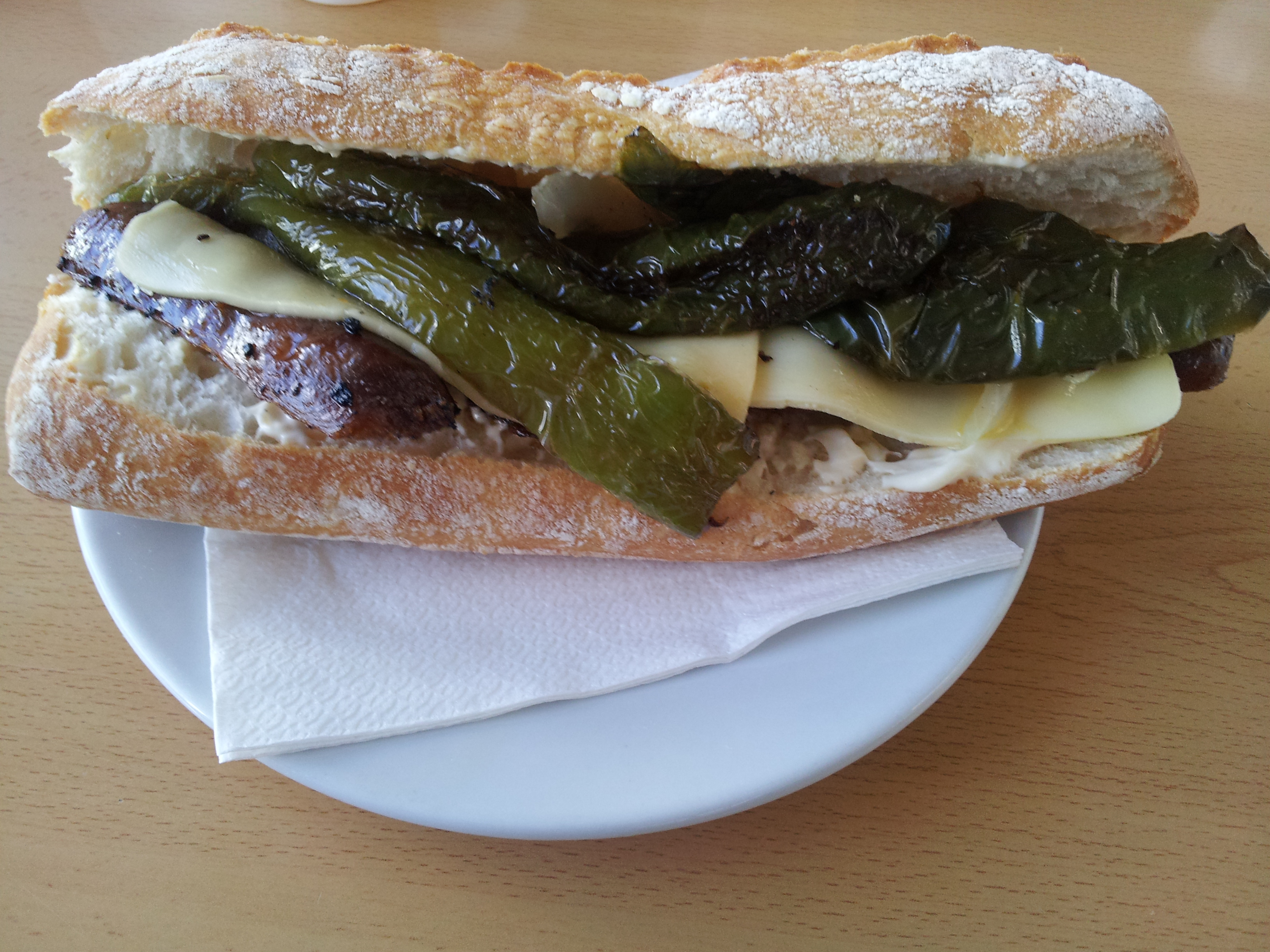
Bocadillo Emanuele

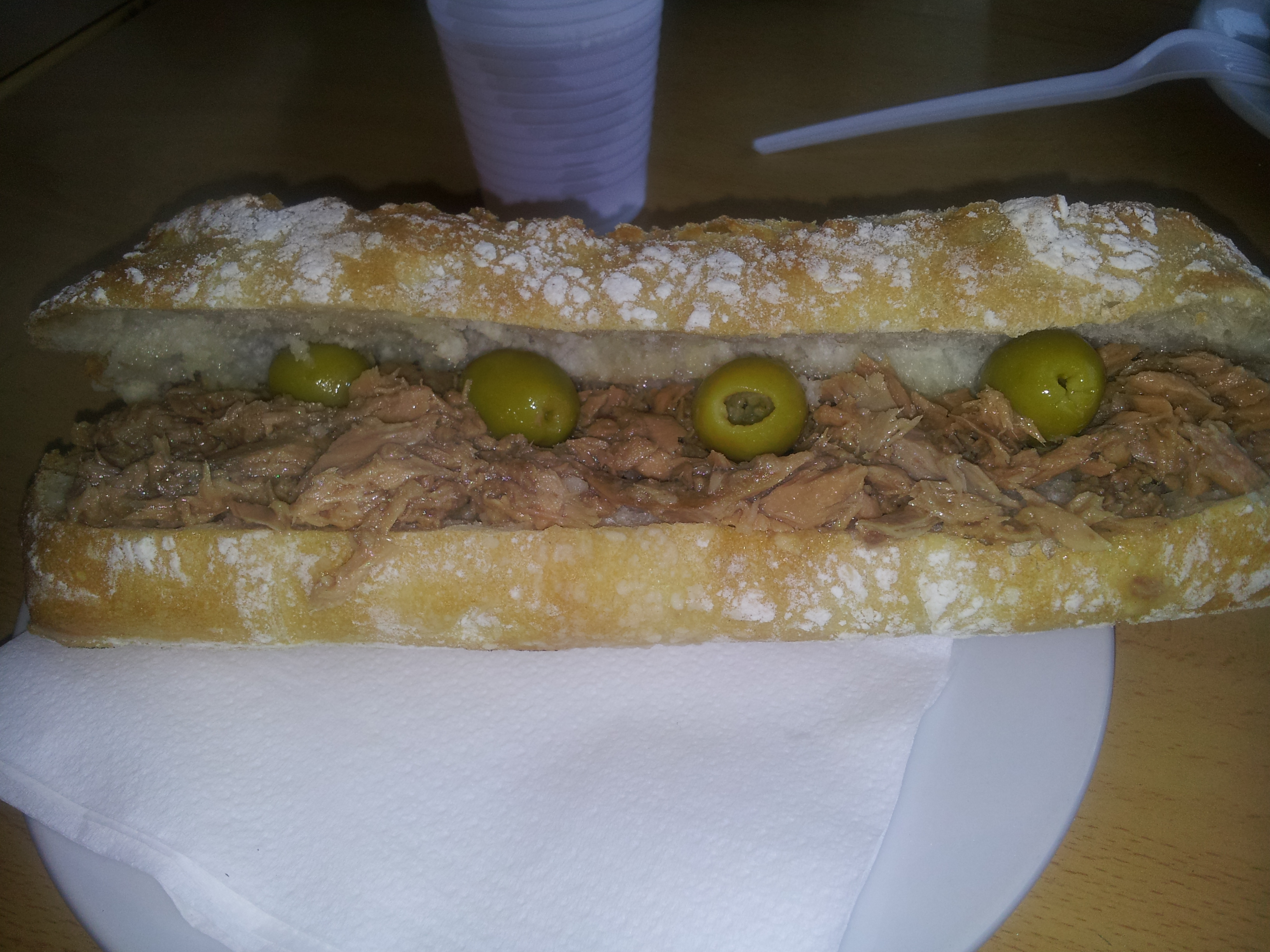
Bocadillo Tuna fish with olives

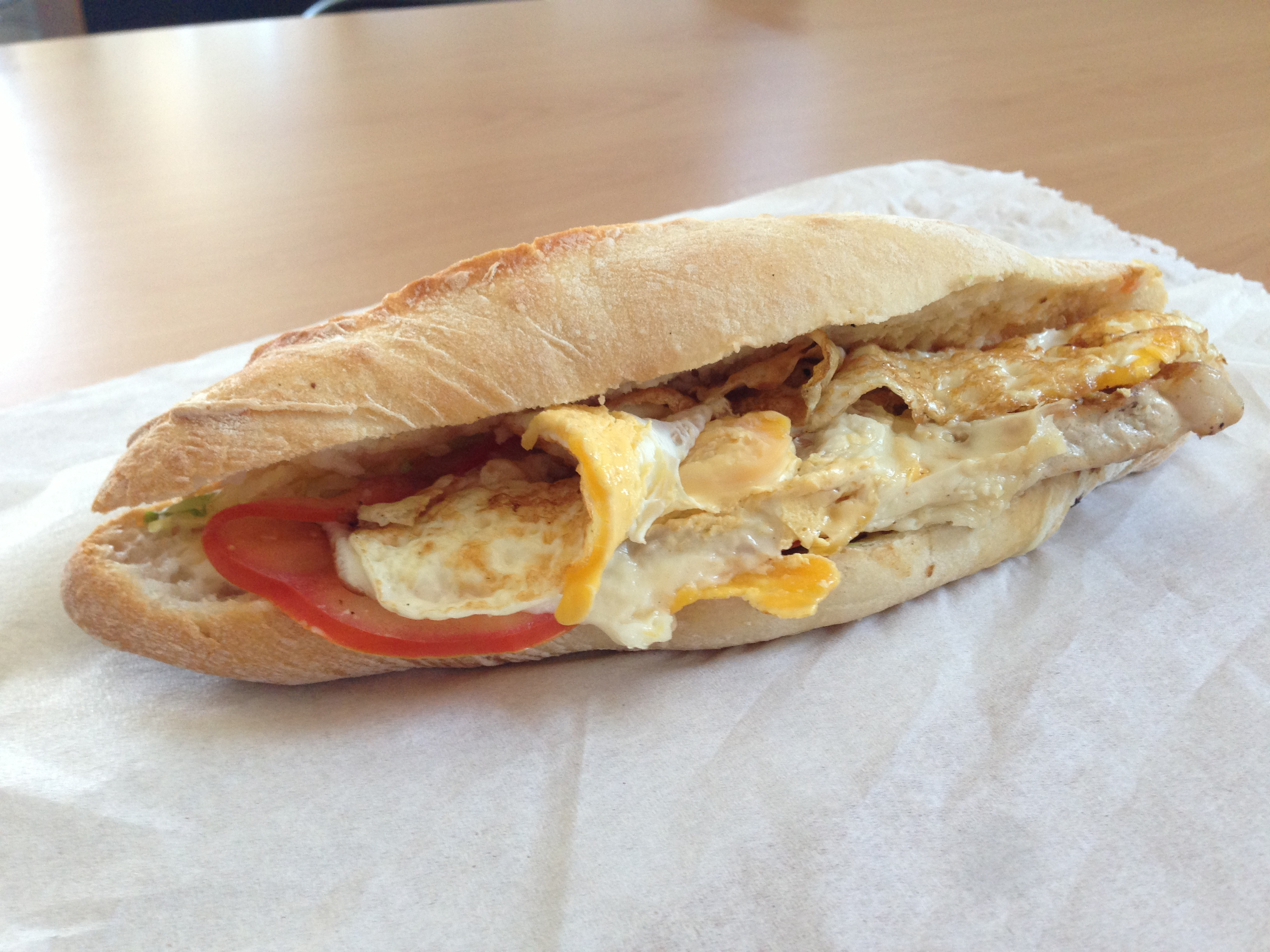
Bocadillo Chivito (the original)

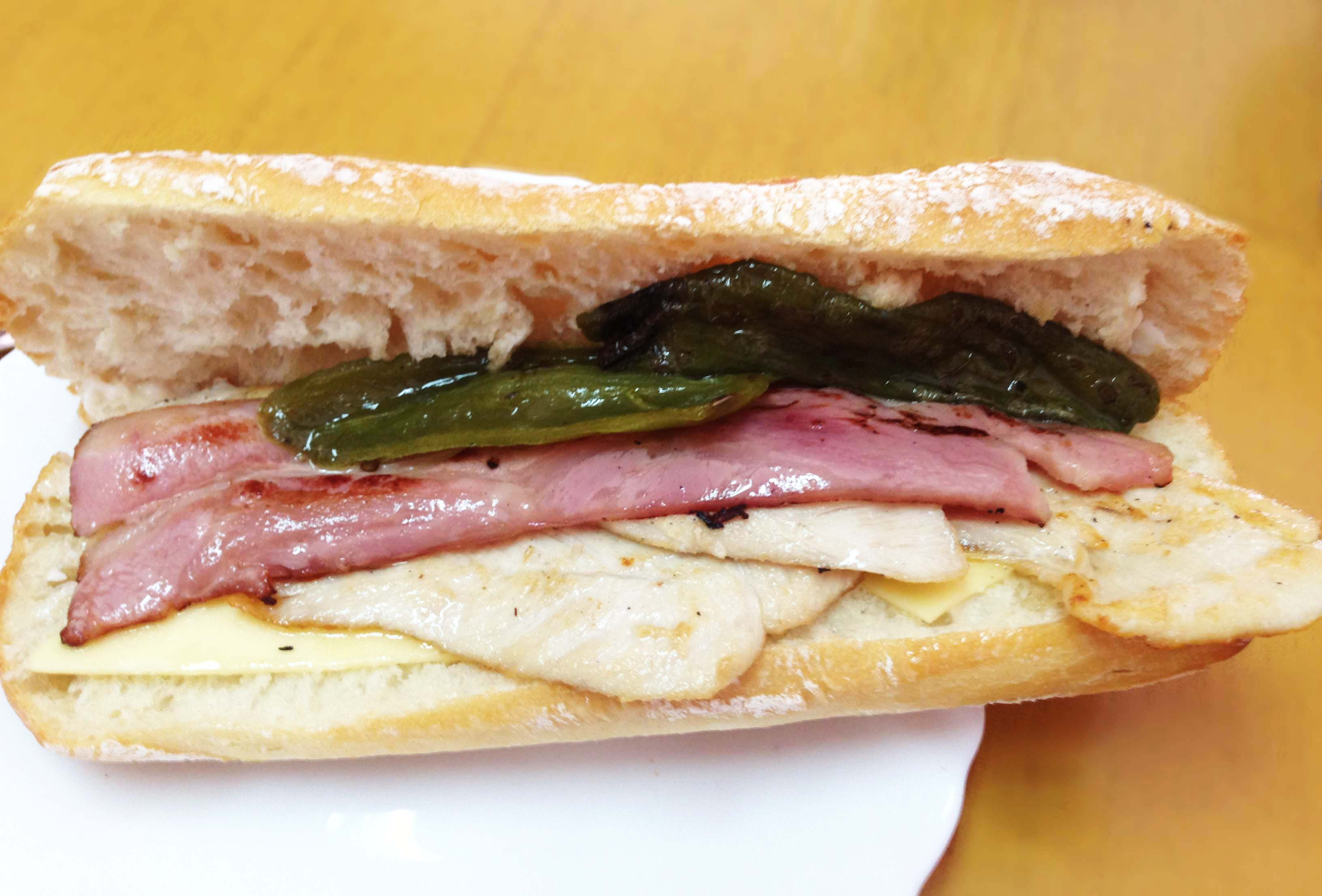
Bocadillo tumbadito

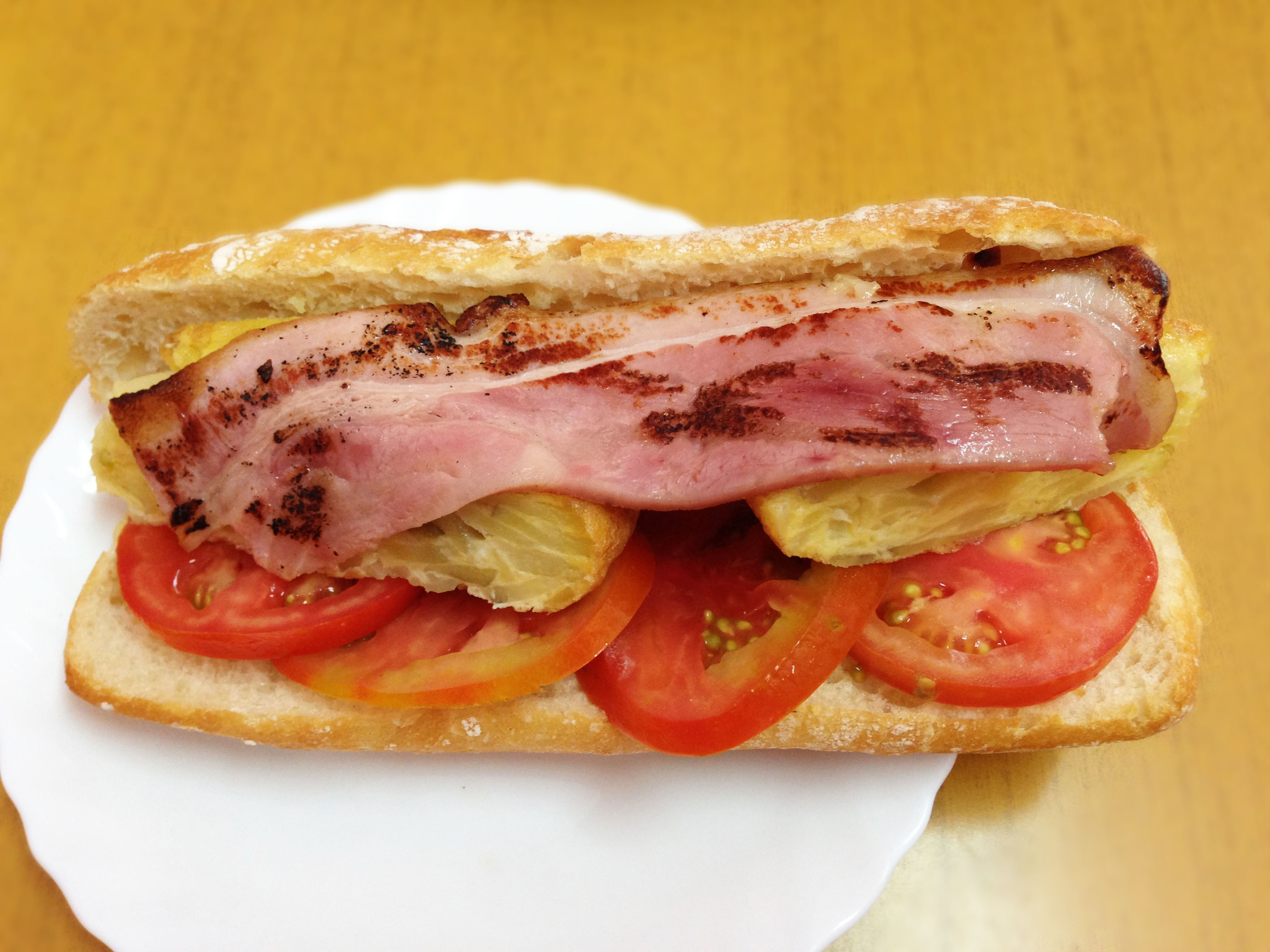
Bocadillo Español

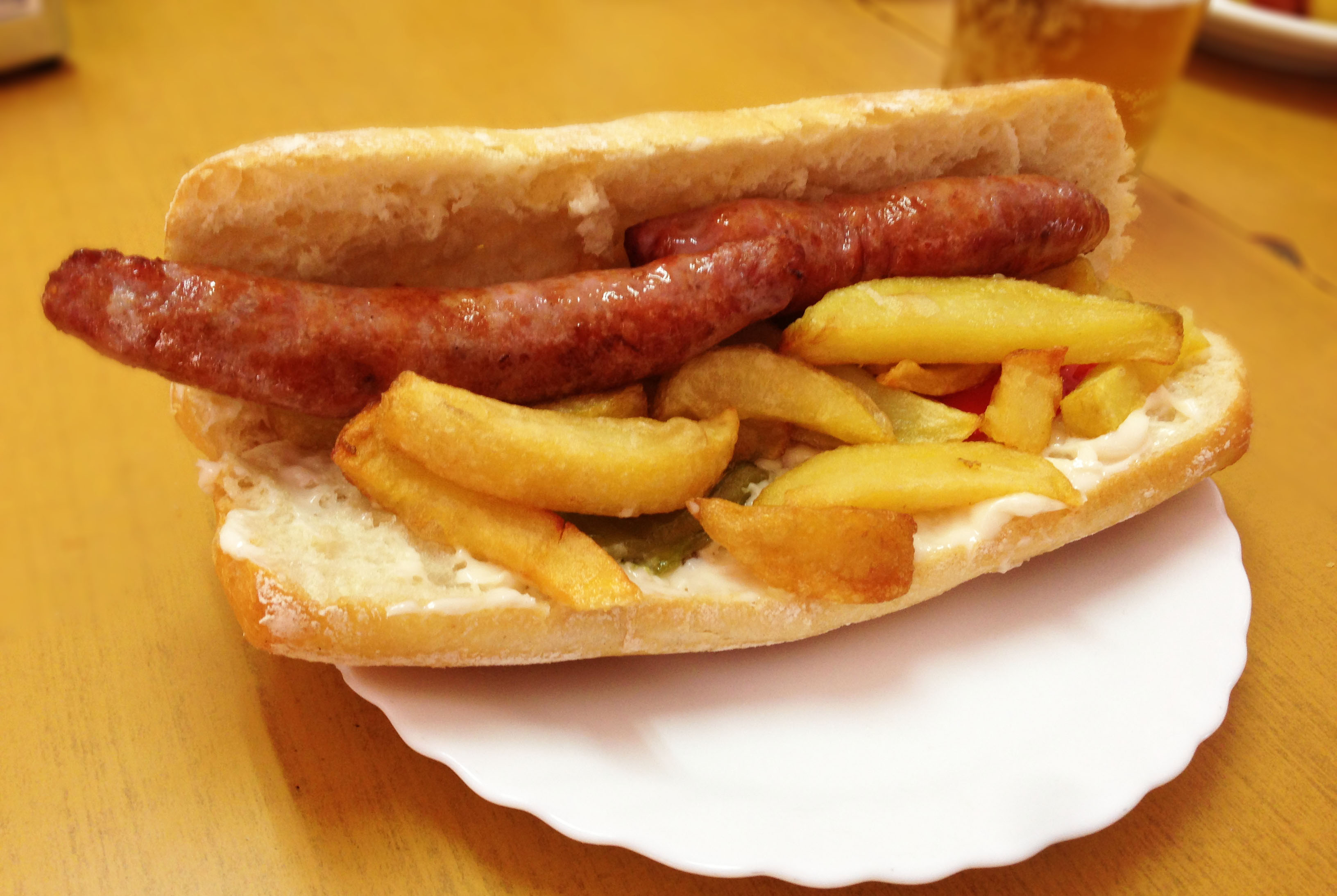
Bocadillo Portugues

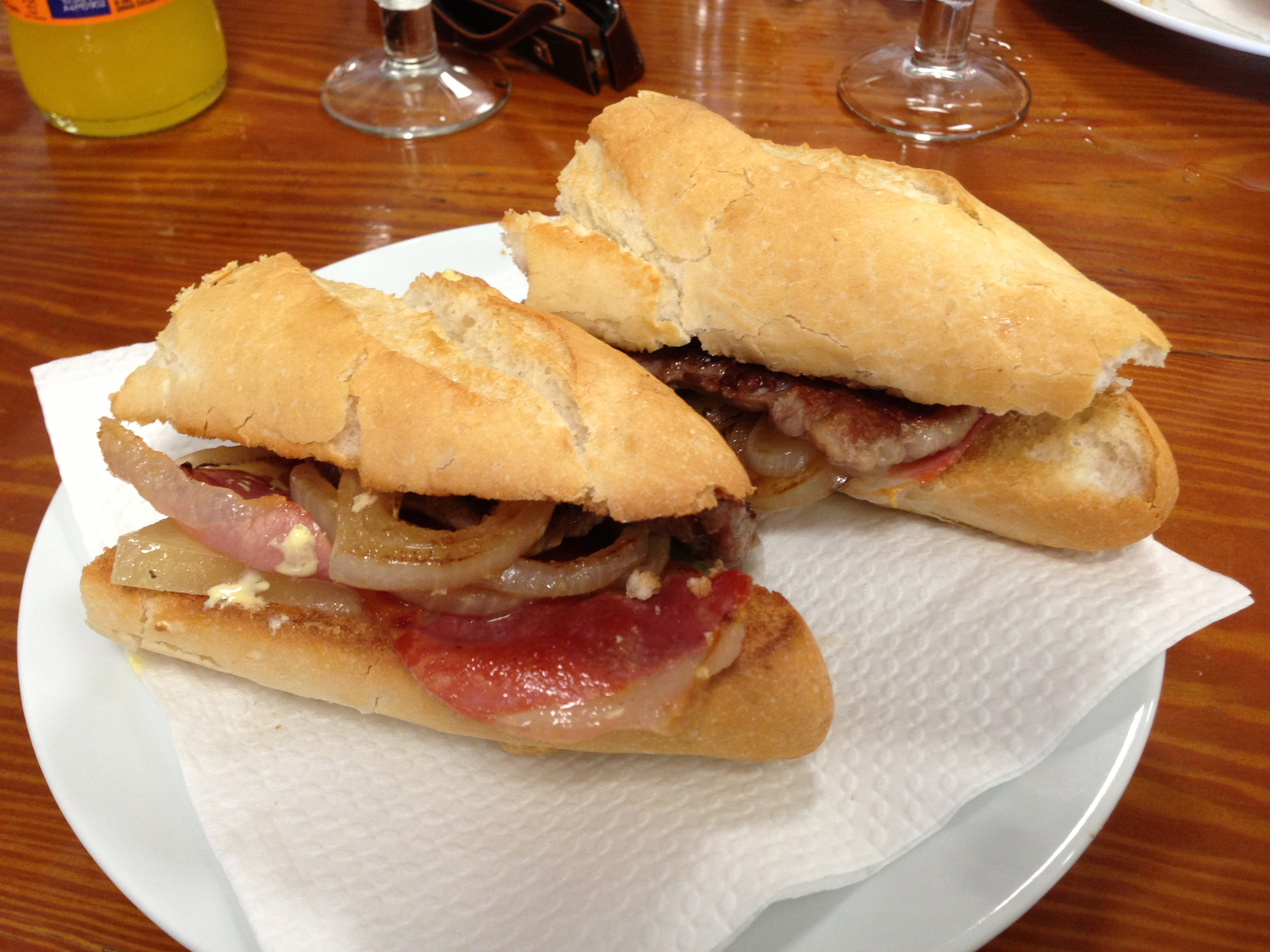
Bocadillo brascada

== See also ==
- List of sandwiches - Cuban sandwich
