= Lhardy =

Coordinates: 40°25′00″N 3°42′05″W

Lhardy is a restaurant located in Madrid, Spain, opened in 1839 by Emilio Huguenin Lhardy. It was said to have introduced French haute cuisine to Madrid in the style of Parisian cuisine. Lhardy has a deli and takeaway service on the ground floor and a formal restaurant on the second floor.

Lhardy is one of the oldest restaurants in Madrid, and has been described as the first luxury restaurant in the city. Founder Emilio Lhardy was drawn to the city by Carmen author Prosper Mérimée, who thought that Madrid needed more high-quality restaurants.

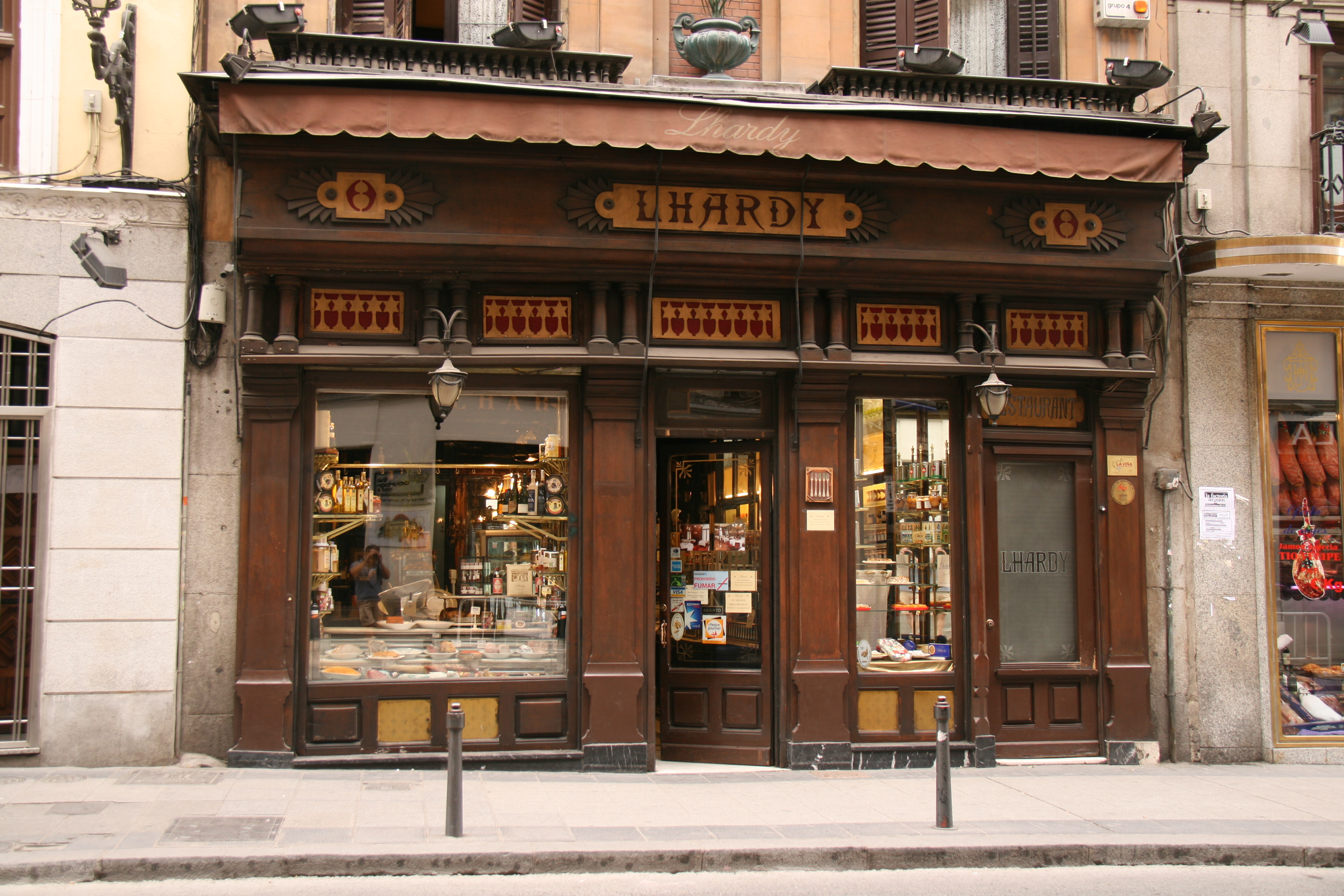
Restaurante Lhardy-2009
