= Leche merengada =

Traditional Spanish cold and sweet drink

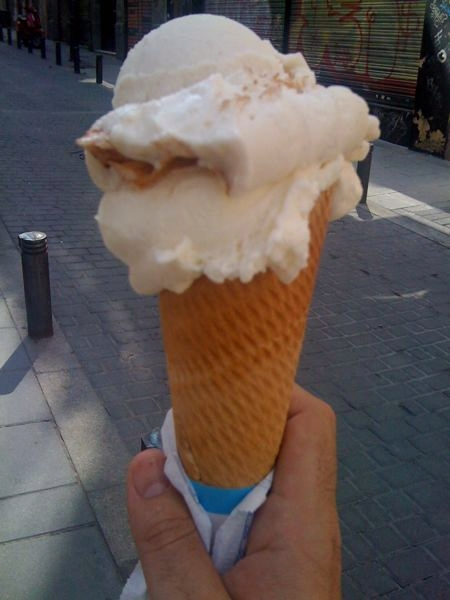
A leche merengada ice cream cone.

Leche merengada is a typical drink of Spain. It is made from a base of milk and egg whites, sweetened with sugar and flavored with cinnamon. It is usually served very cold, such that part of the drink is partially frozen with a texture similar to snow. It is a standard drink offered at ice cream parlors and horchaterías throughout Spanish cities.

== Characteristics ==
Technically this drink is considered a milkshake with egg, sweetened with any sweetener (but usually sugar). To make it, the following ingredients are mixed into milk: egg white, sugar, cinnamon (stick or powder), and sometimes lemon rind and/or vanilla. For additional flavoring, a small amount of salt is generally used. The mixture is usually beaten in an electric mixer (in the past by hand), and then placed in a freezer so that it acquires the semi-frozen texture reminiscent of snow.

The drink can be served in various ways; for example, some cooks add a few drops of coffee. The nutritional characteristics are such that it is generally considered a dessert served after meals. On certain occasions it may be served as a snack or simply restorative drink.

== See also ==
- Ice milk
- Malted milk
