= Al ajillo =

Cooking style

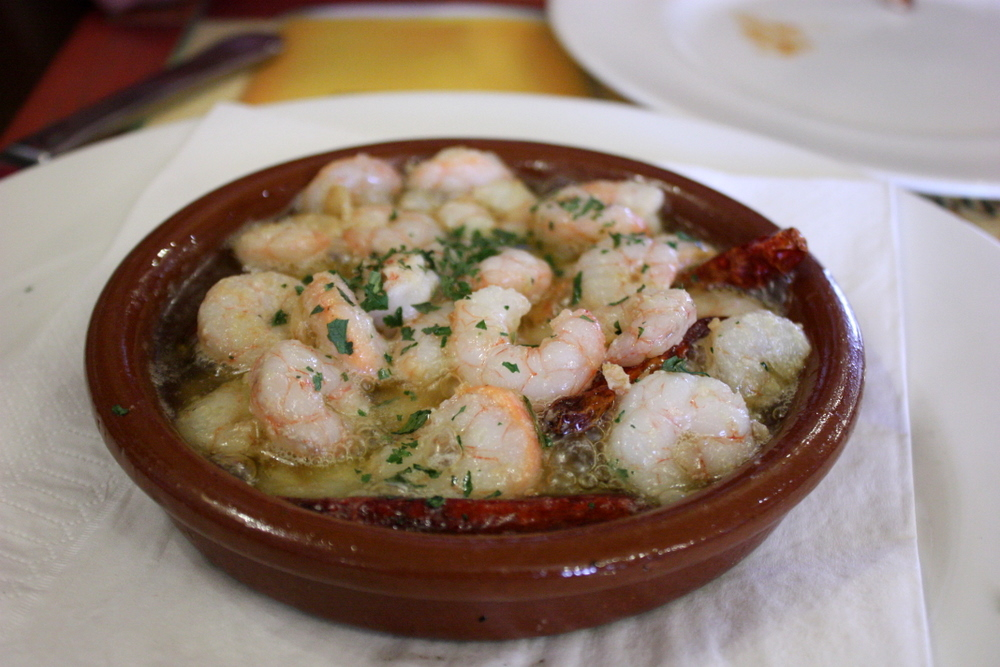
Prawn with garlic (gambas al ajillo) in Madrid

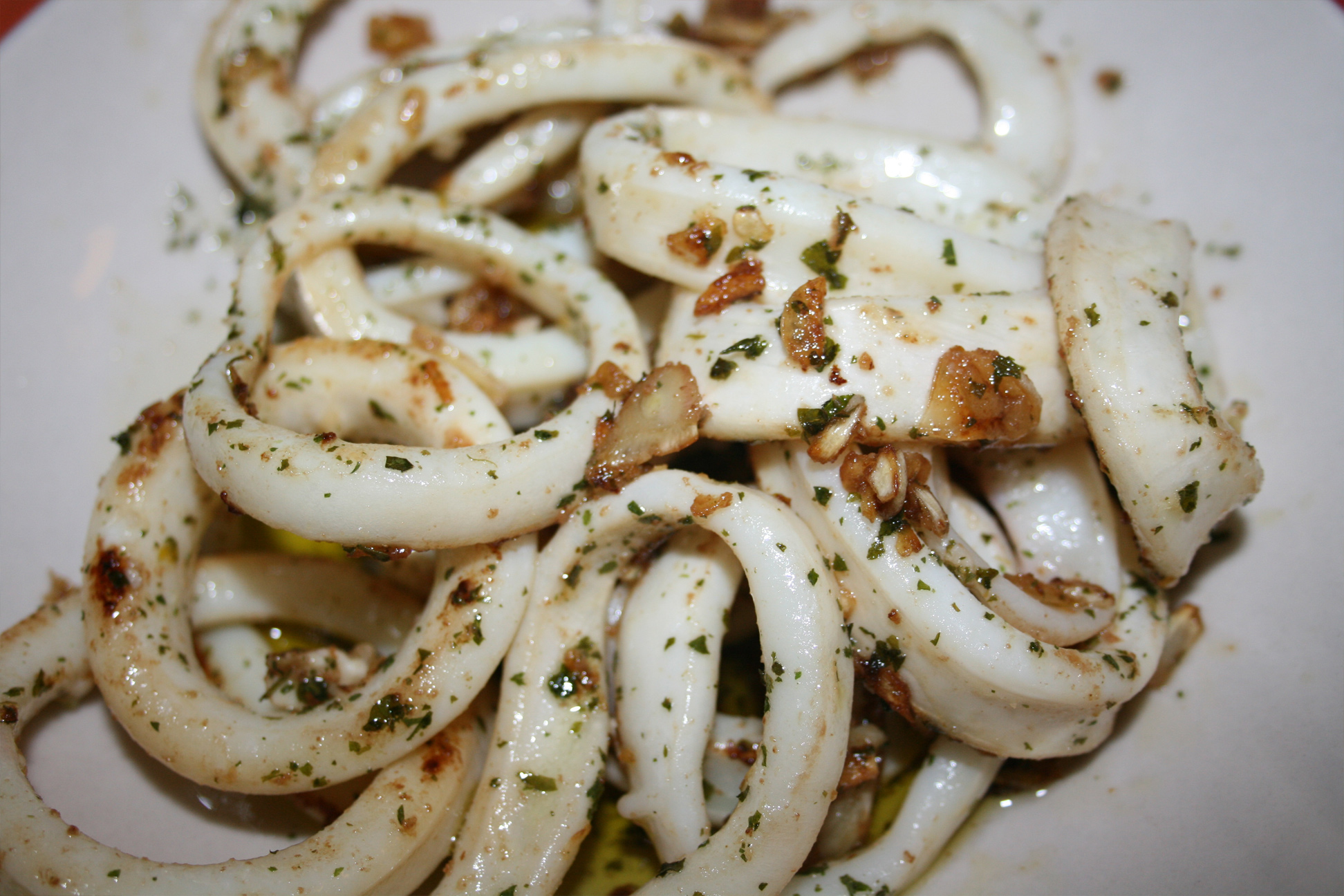
Calamari with garlic (calamares al ajillo)

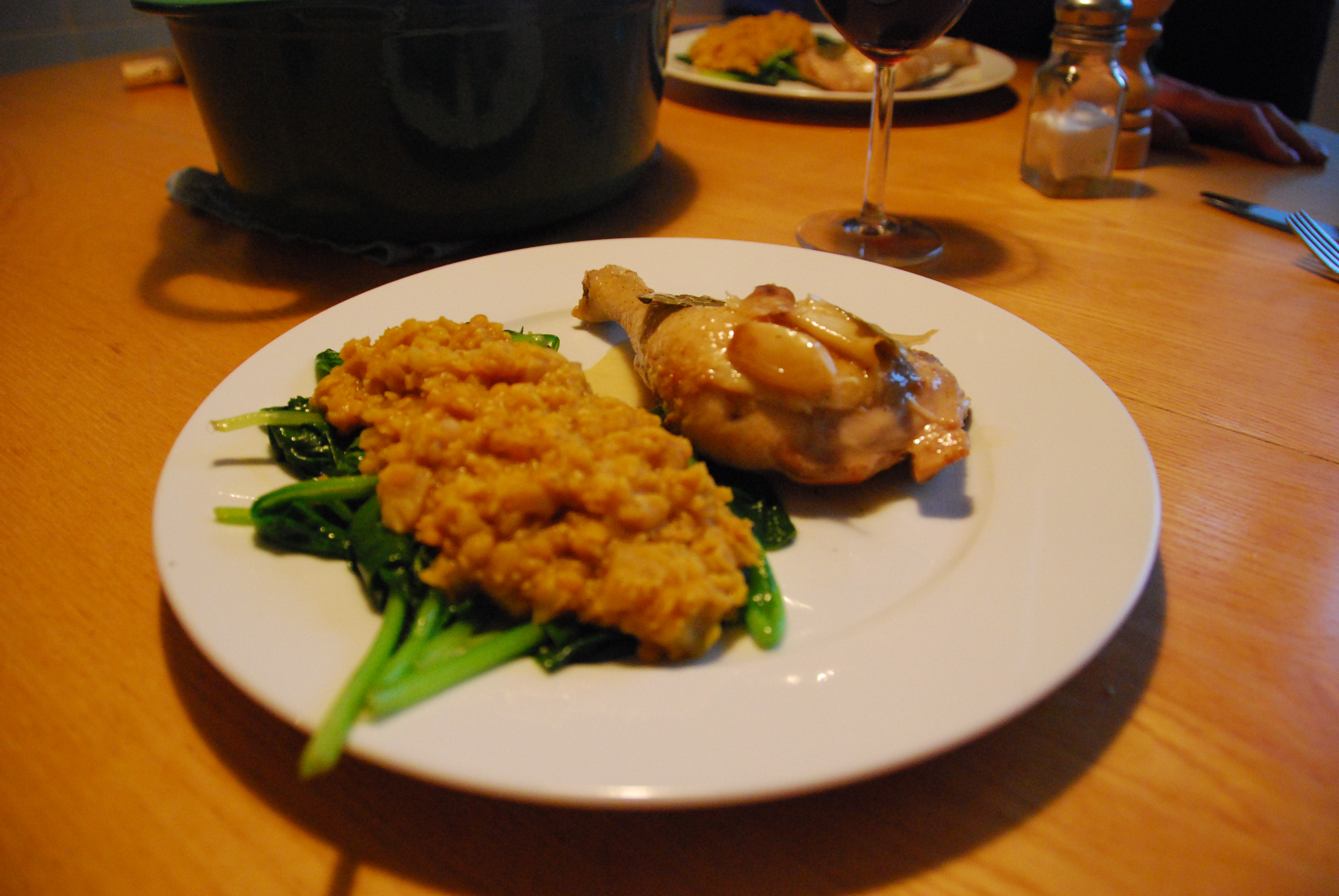
Chicken with garlic (pollo al ajillo)

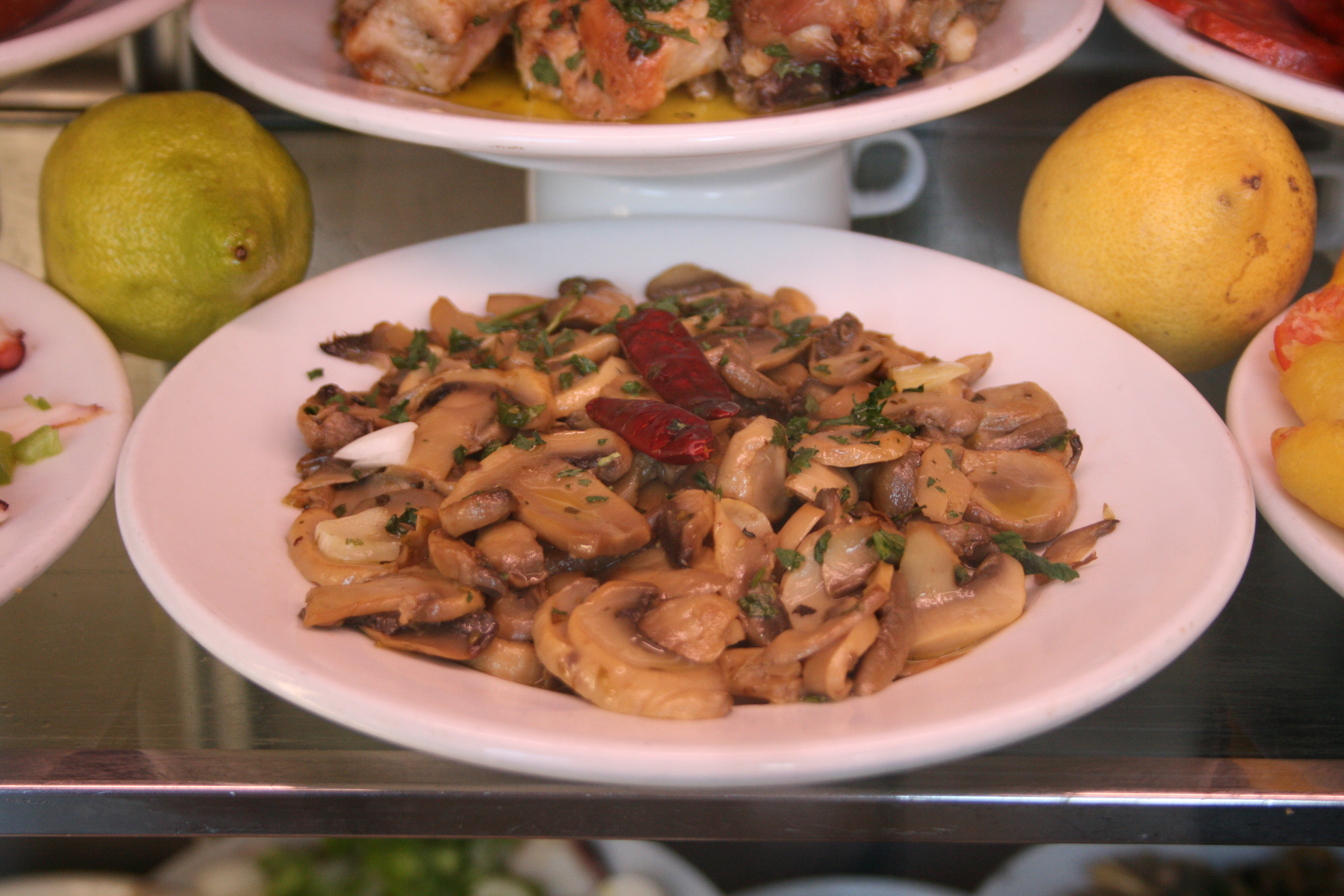
Mushrooms with garlic (setas al ajillo) in Madrid

Al ajillo (lit. with garlic) is a typical cooking style utilizing garlic in the cuisines of the Spanish-speaking world. The origin is Spain, with influence by the Moors. Beyond Spain, the style has influenced Latin America and broader Hispanic cuisines through colonization and migration, appearing in adaptations.

The Spanish dish gambas al ajillo, is prawns cooked in a garlic and oil. In Mexico, camarones al ajillo combines shrimp, guajillo chili peppers and garlic (ajo). In other Latin American countries the dish is similar, but using other chilies. The aji panca, or aji mirasol in Peruvian cooking, use dried forms of aji amarillo.

== Notable dishes ==
=== Gambas al ajillo ===
Gambas al ajillo, or prawns with garlic, is a Spanish dish originating in Madrid in the 16th century. This is one of the more popular tapas dishes in Spain.

The ingredients are peeled prawn, garlic, and olive oil, which are typically cooked in an earthenware casserole dish. Other preparations include a splash of sherry, white wine, fresh or dried parsley, paprika, and/or chili pepper.

=== Camarones al ajillo ===
Camarones al ajillo, or shrimp with garlic, is a Mexican dish. It is made with shrimp that are fried in a pan with butter or vegetable oil, in which slices of garlic and guajillo chile have been frying. It is seasoned with salt, black pepper, lemon and parsley or coriander.

=== Pescado al ajillo ===
Pescado al ajillo is a dish made with fish fillet fried in a pan with butter or vegetable oil, in which slices of garlic and Guajillo chili have been frying. It is seasoned with salt, black pepper, lemon and parsley or coriander.

=== Pollo al ajillo ===
Pollo al ajillo, or chicken with garlic, is a Spanish dish made with chicken marinated in garlic, lime juice, olive oil, and salt; and cooked over a skillet. Other optional ingredients include dry white wine, bay leaf, rosemary, and/or thyme. It is usually served with rice, potatoes, or a baguette.

=== Setas al ajillo ===
Setas al ajillo, or mushrooms with garlic, are a traditional mushroom dish served as tapas in some bars in Spain. The mushrooms are sautéed and seasoned with garlic, olive oil, and garnished with parsley.

== Bibliography ==
- Bayless, Rick. Mexican Kitchen. (1996). ISBN 978-0-684-80006-6.
