= Squid sandwich =

Seafood sandwich popular in Spain

Squid sandwich (bocadillo de calamares)
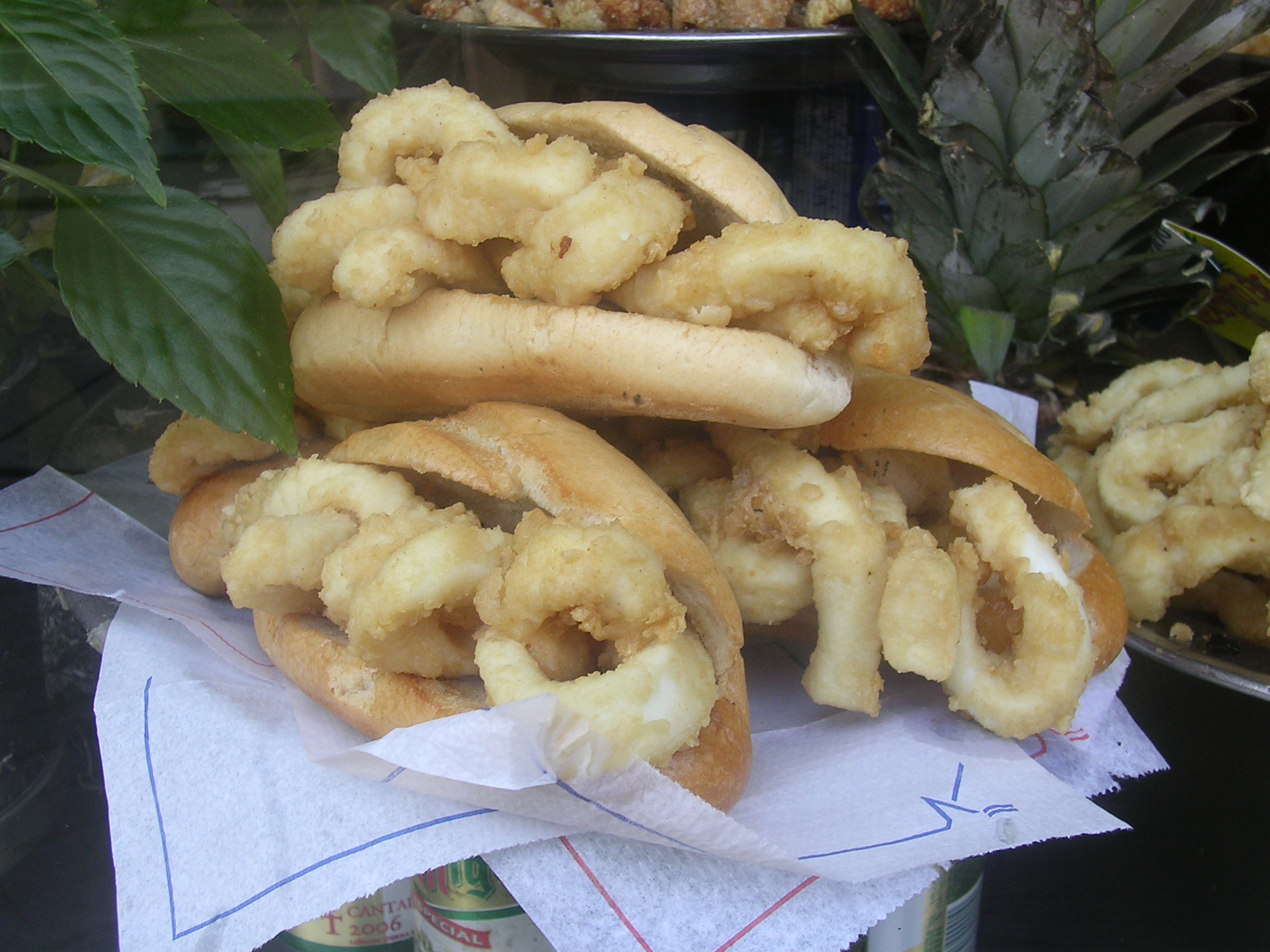
- Squid sandwich
- Place of origin: Madrid, Spain
- Main ingredients: Bread, fried squid

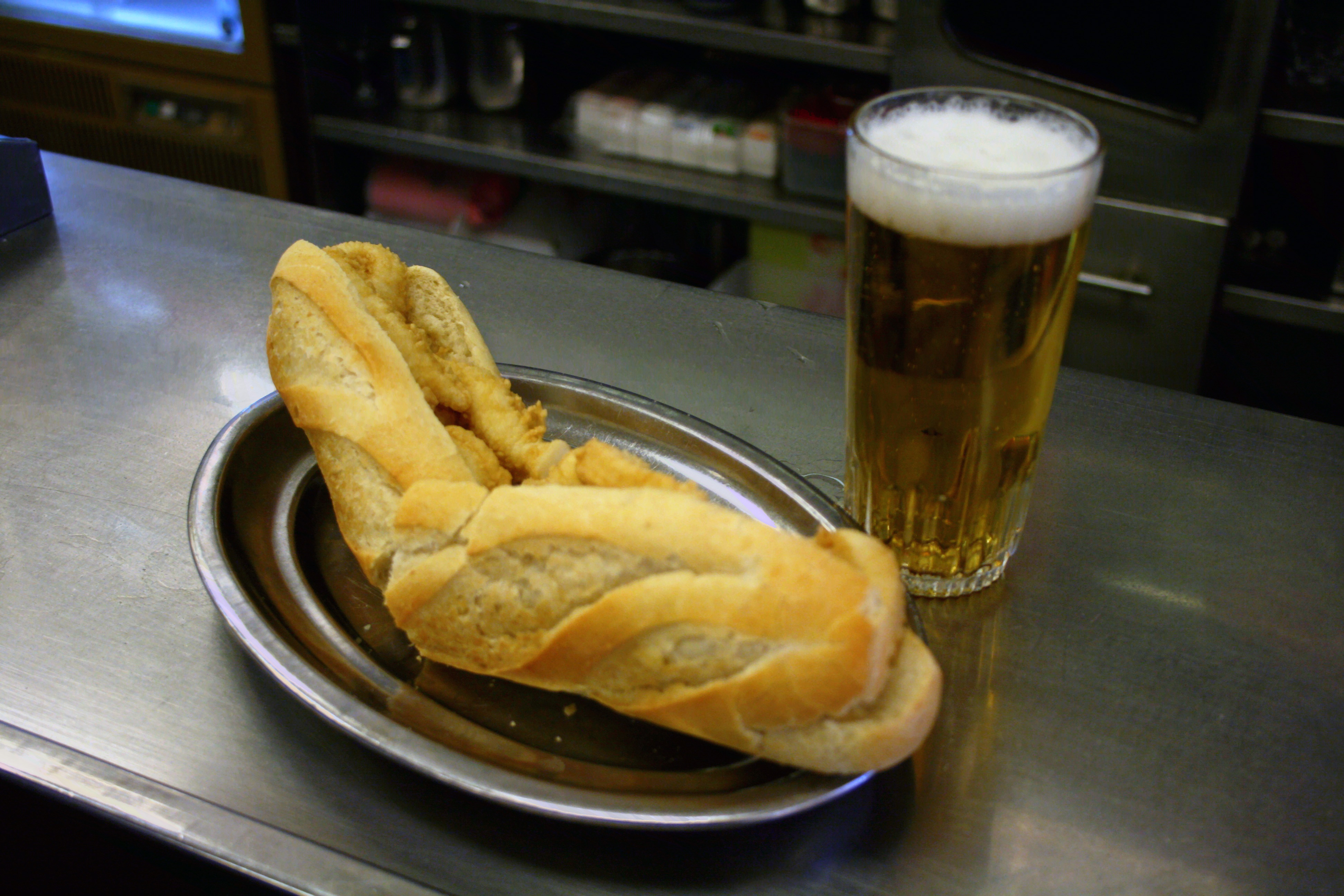
Squid sandwich (bocadillo de calamares) with beer

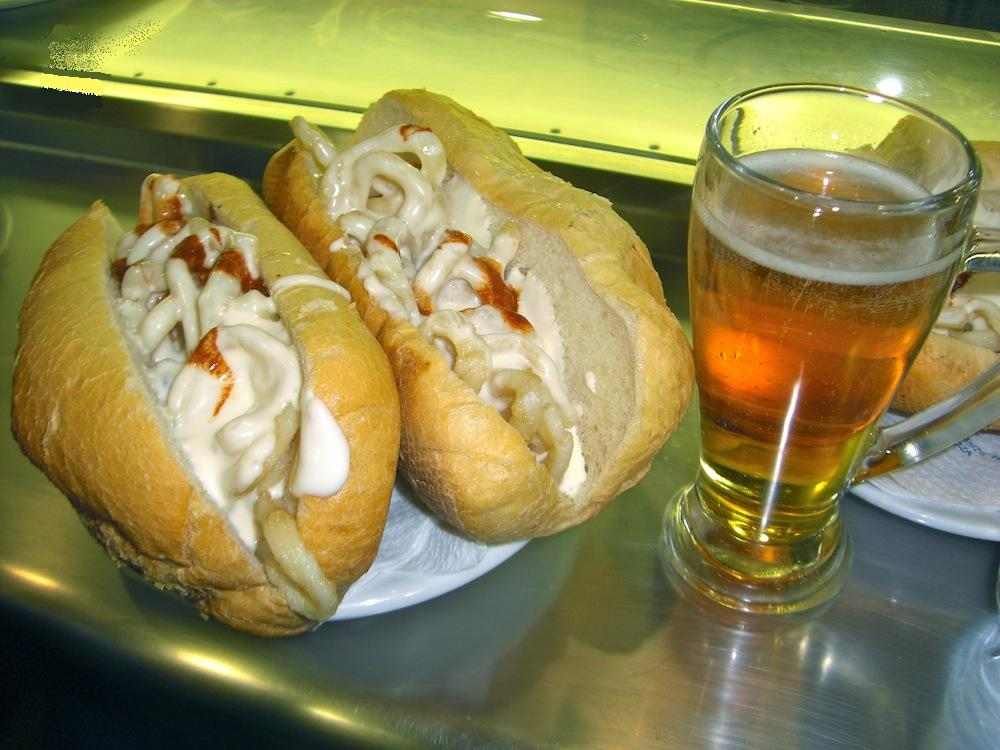
Spicy squid sandwich (bocadillos de calamares bravos) from Zaragoza with beer

Squid sandwich or bocadillo de calamares in Spanish, bocata calamares in Cheli, is a culinary specialty very common in Spain consisting of a bocadillo sandwich of squid battered in flour and fried in oil that is usually olive, or the more sophisticated version that is all of the above plus a spicy tomato sauce and mayonnaise with garlic similar to that of patatas bravas. It is usually served hot and freshly made. This type of sandwich (specifically the original version without sauce) is very popular in Madrid and can be found in most of the bars of the Spanish capital, particularly in the Plaza Mayor as well as the Calle de Botoneras at the southeast corner of Plaza Mayor. In Zaragoza, the sophisticated version of the calamari sandwich is traditional, with the spicy sauce (tomato, mayonnaise and garlic), and it is called bocadillo de calamares bravos or spicy squid sandwich, which is served in the bars on Calle Cinco de Marzo.

== Preparation ==
The squid are usually cut into rings that are one-centimeter thick, coated with flour and baking powder. After this initial preparation, they are fried in hot oil until they are golden brown. In Zaragoza, spicy tomato-based sauce, mayonnaise and garlic will be added. The bread is usually sliced on one side. Traditionally, it was served with bread full of fried breadcrumbs. Recently, baguettes from the establishment are usually made from previously frozen dough, which is usually cut on one side, giving each place a characteristic touch.

== Presentation ==
Sometimes a bit of squeezed lemon is added to the fried squid dish for flavor, and mayonnaise is also common. It is usually accompanied with a very cold beer. The squids are usually served in bread that is opened only on one side and is filled with fried breadcrumbs.

== Variations ==
The bocadillo de calamares or fried squid ring sandwich, is very popular in northern Spain, where fresh squid can be found on the coast. The method of preparation is similar to that of the Madrid version and it can be found in various bars and restaurants in Cantabria, as well as in the Basque Country. In Madrid, there are even Rutas del Bocadillo de Calamares (Squid Sandwich Routes) that allow one to become acquainted with all the various versions of the sandwich.

== See also ==
- Squid as food
