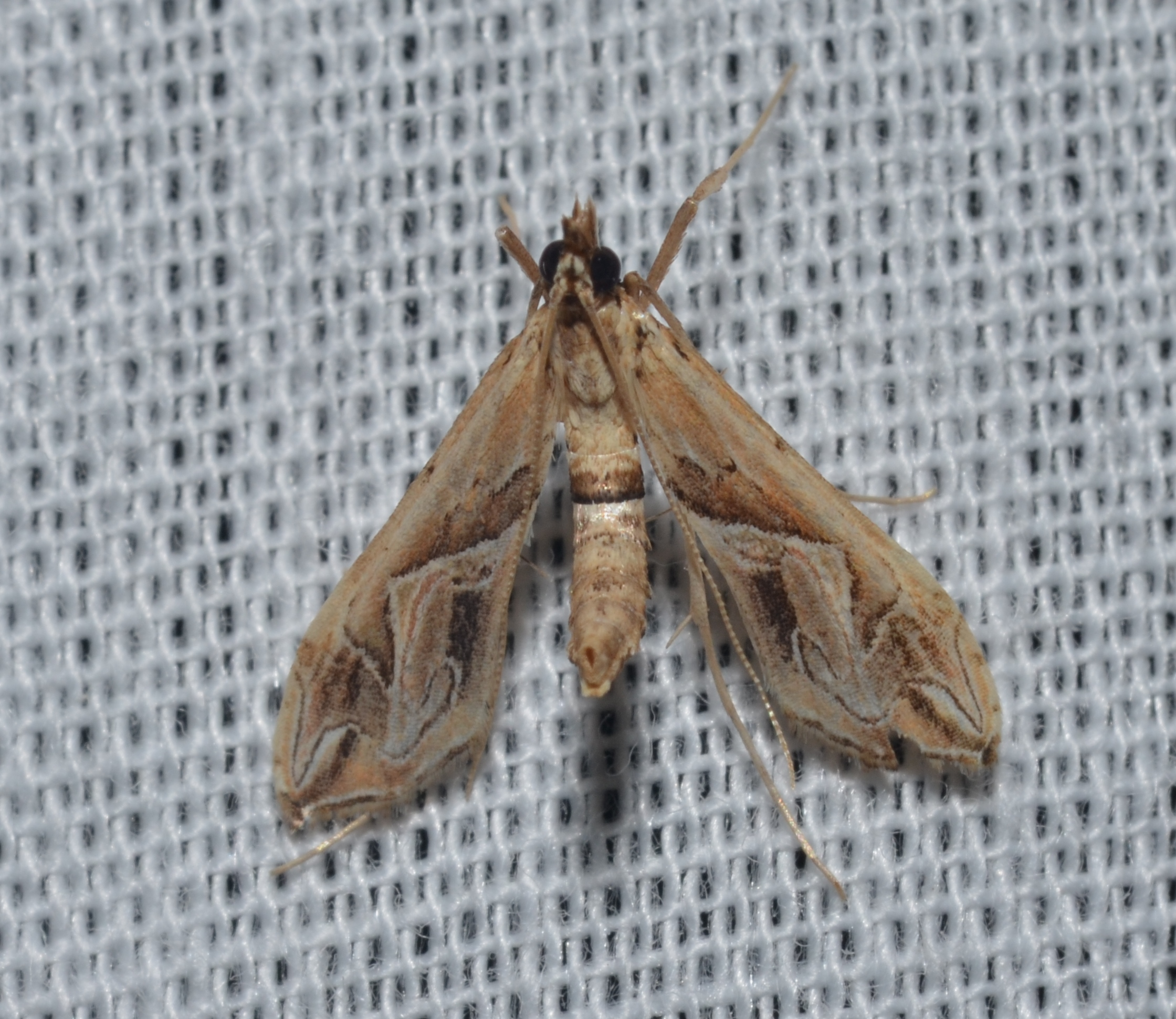

Scientific classification
- Kingdom: Animalia
- Phylum: Arthropoda
- Class: Insecta
- Order: Lepidoptera
- Family: Crambidae
- Genus: Lineodes
- Species: L. fontella

Binomial name
- Lineodes fontella Walsingham in Hampson, 1913

= Lineodes fontella =

Species of moth

Lineodes fontella, the eastern lineodes moth, is a moth in the family Crambidae. It was described by Walsingham in 1913. It is found in the United States, where it has been recorded from Florida, North Carolina, South Carolina and Texas. Outside of the States, it is found in Jamaica, Cuba, the Dominican Republic, Mexico, Panama, Guatemala, Honduras, Brazil, French Guiana and Guyana.

The wingspan is 12–23 mm. The wings are pale tan. Adults are on wing year-round in Florida and between August and November in other areas of the United States.

The larvae feed on the fruit of Physalis angulata, Physalis philadelphica, Physalis pubescens, Physalis viscosa and Physalis walteri. They have been found from April to October. The larvae are pale.
