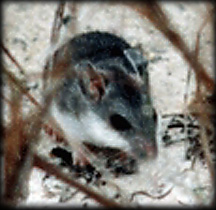

Conservation status
- Critically Imperiled (NatureServe)

- Endangered (ESA)

Scientific classification
- Kingdom: Animalia
- Phylum: Chordata
- Class: Mammalia
- Order: Rodentia
- Family: Cricetidae
- Subfamily: Neotominae
- Genus: Peromyscus
- Species: P. polionotus
- Subspecies: P. p. phasma

Trinomial name
- Peromyscus polionotus phasma Bangs, 1898

= Anastasia Island beach mouse =

Subspecies of rodent

The Anastasia Island beach mouse (Peromyscus polionotus phasma) is a subspecies of the oldfield mouse, a rodent in the family Cricetidae. It is a subspecies of the genus Peromyscus, a closely related group of New World mice often called "deermice". It occurs in the sand dunes of Florida beaches in the United States. It has been classified by the United States Fish and Wildlife Service as an endangered species due to the specificity of its habitat and the natural and human-induced destruction thereof.

== Description ==
The Anastasia Island beach mouse has an average body length of 13.85–14.28 cm (5.45–5.62 in) including tail. The coat tends to be a pale tan color with a white underbelly. Subtle white markings can be found across the face and muzzle. Their coloration, being substantially lighter than inland members of their species, is thought to be an adaptation to help them blend into their sandy habitats and avoid predators. Males and non-reproducing females average a weight of 12.5 g (0.44 oz) and pregnant females have an average weight of 20 g (0.71 oz).

== Habitat ==
The mouse occurs in the sandy dunes of Anastasia Island in Florida. Though the species once ranged from St. Johns River in northern Florida to Anastasia Island in St. Augustine, Florida, habitat destruction limited and eventually eliminated populations in the northern part of the state. The mature, sparsely vegetated, scrubby dunes offer the best burrowing environment, as well as providing the mice with ample food sources. These dunes tend to occur between the high-tide line and the more densely vegetated dunes farther inland. Though sometimes found in the inland dunes, very little foraging takes place there. The mice use the heavy coastal grass cover there to provide protection and avoid detection from predators. Occasionally, beach mice make their homes in abandoned burrows of ghost crabs, but are also capable of creating their own.

== Behavior ==
=== Diet ===
The mice eat small insects and coastal plant such as beach grasses and sea oats. They gather seeds which have separated from the plant and blown to the ground. Every night, they leave their burrows to gather the sea oat seeds which have blown to the ground, then return them to their burrows for storage. Due to the highly variable climate of coastal habitats, though, several seasonal plants can offer additional food sources throughout the year, such as the beach pea (Galactia spp.), coastal ground cherry (Physalis angustifolia), dixie sandmat (Euphorbia bombensis), tall jointweed (Polygonella gracilis), seaside pennywort (Hydrocotyle bonariensis), seabeach evening primrose (Oenothera humifusa) and the seacoast marshelder (Iva imbricata)

=== Shelter ===
Burrows tend to be constructed at the base of a clump of grass on the sloping side of a dune, and are occupied by either a monogamous, mating pair of mice or a female and her young. The entrance is a small hole, typically 1–2 inches in diameter, followed by a 3–4 foot tunnel of the same diameter. The tunnel leads to a main chamber, which typically has a second 'escape tunnel' leading out the back. The escape tunnel has no opening at the surface, but ends just below the sand's surface. If the mouse's burrow is invaded or disturbed, the mouse will access the escape tunnel and push through the layer of sand at the end to the surface. These burrows are used for food storage, sleeping, and nesting, as well as a refuge from predators.

=== Reproduction ===
The species is monogamous. Females reach reproductive maturity at 6 weeks and can produce a litter of pups in as little as 20–23 days. The breeding season lasts from November to early January, but can continue throughout the year if climate and food sources are optimal. The average litter of pups is 4, but can range in size from 2–7.

=== Survival ===
Though the average lifespan is 9 months, mortality is high and most young survive around 4 months.

Native predators include coastal dwellers such as snakes, skunks, raccoons, and the great blue heron. Some introduced species which pose a threat to the mouse are domestic cats and dogs, as well as foxes.

== Reasons for endangered status ==
Because of the specificity of the dune habitat, the Anastasia Island beach mouse is extremely vulnerable to environmental factors. Because of the high real estate values of the coastal habitat of the mice, major commercial and residential development is continually encroaching on the dunes they call home. Humans become a more regular part of the environment, which contributes both directly and indirectly to the endangerment of the mice. Both by visiting, directly interacting with, and subsequently contributing to the degradation of the dune habitat, as well as bringing their domesticated pets into the environment, thus increasing the threat of introduced predators, the overlapping of human and mouse activity is posing an ever-increasing threat to the relatively defenseless mouse.

In addition to direct human contributions, increasing hurricane seasons may also be to blame for the vulnerability of the Anastasia Island beach mouse. The formation of the sandy beach dunes is due largely in part to the presence of coastal grasses and other plants establishing themselves in the sand. As they emerge from the ground, wind begins to pile sand up at the base of the plants. As the plants grow and the wind continues to blow, these piles increase in size and overlap the adjacent piles and, eventually, dunes are formed. This formation process can take large amounts of time, and as hurricanes increase in frequency and severity, the length of time for dunes to recover and reform before the next storm becomes less and less adequate. While the dunes are in the process of regenerating, beach mice must take up residence in intermediate "matrix" habitat, which is less ideal for their food foraging and burrow establishing than their eventual dune homes. This, also, puts them more at risk of succumbing to environmental factors.

== Conservation options ==
There are several conservation options, at both the governmental and the personal level, that can help preserve and recover the Anastasia Island beach mouse population.

Reintroduction is the process of conservationists and park officials setting up a small population of mice in a habitat where it is known to have previously existed. If the potential habitat contains suitable structural features and food sources, and makes the mouse no more susceptible to predators or other potentially harmful factors than their present environment, small populations can be transported and released in the new habitat, with the hopes that they will adjust well and take up residence.

Another option is that of translocation. Individuals from large, well-established populations can be trapped, relocated, and released into smaller populations in order to supplement their numbers and increase their genetic diversity. This can not only help boost their population levels, but can actually help the long-term viability of the population by increasing the number of established individuals in the gene pool. This can make the group less vulnerable to diseases and genetic maladies in the long run.

As for people who live in the vicinity of the beach mouse habitat, there are several steps they can take to help ensure the longevity of the species. First, they can become familiar with the plants that serve as anchors for the dunes' sand and make an effort not to disrupt the structural integrity of the habitat. In addition to holding the dunes in place, they also serve as food sources for the beach mouse, so to disturb these plants is to put the entire ecosystem at risk. In avoiding these plants, a good rule of thumb is to remain on paths and trails when walking on or near the beach. Another rule for beach living is to keep cats indoors as frequently as one can, and to never feed stray cats on the beach. With domesticated cats being one of the biggest predator threats to the beach mouse, humans should do nothing to encourage their presence in this environment.
