= Physalis latiphysa =

Scientific classification
- Kingdom: Plantae
- Clade: Tracheophytes
- Clade: Angiosperms
- Clade: Eudicots
- Clade: Asterids
- Order: Solanales
- Family: Solanaceae
- Genus: Physalis
- Species: P. latiphysa

Binomial name
- Physalis latiphysa Waterf.

Species of plant

Physalis latiphysa is a herbaceous plant that grows to a height of 30 to 45 cm. The shoot axis is densely hairy with multicellular, glandular trichomes. The leaves are silky and hairy, 5.5 to 16.0 cm long, with petioles 2.5 to 7.5 cm and leaf blades 3.0 to 8.5 cm. The leaf blade has a width of 1.5 to 7.0 cm, the tip is tapering, the base is blunt, rarely skewed by up to 3 mm. The leaf margin is entire or rarely serrated with up to four teeth per side.

The flowers are on 4 to 11 mm long pedicels; the calyx has pointed calyx lobes, is glandular hairy and 2.2 to 2.5 mm long and 1.0 to 1.5 mm wide. The corolla is creamy yellow, each of the five fused petals has five dark blue markings on the inside, the corolla diameter is 3.5 to 4.0 mm. The stamens are hairy and colored blue, the anthers blue or mottled blue with a length of 1 mm. The flowering period is between July and September.

When the fruit ripens, the stem lengthens to 1.8 to 2.0 cm, the calyx increases to 3 to 4 cm in length and a diameter of 2.5 to 3.5 mm, and is often as long as it is wide. The entire surface of the calyx is hairy glandular. The cross-section of the calyx is strongly pentagonal. The fruit is a spherical berry, 1.3 to 2.0 mm in diameter, non-sticky and containing numerous brown, granular seeds, 2.5 mm in diameter.

== Distribution ==
The species occurs in southern Arizona, and has also been attested in Sonora, Guanajuato, and Michoacán.

== Taxonomy ==
Physalis latiphysa is classified within the genus Physalis in the section Epeteiorhiza of the subgenus Rydbergis. It is most similar to Physalis pruinosa, differing mainly in the shorter flower stalks and the blue anthers. These traits are also seen in Physalis nicandroides, unlike this species, Physalis latiphysa has longer trichomes, thinner fruit stalks and a papery rather than leathery calyx. Both these species also differ from Physalis latiphysa in that they have sticky fruits.
