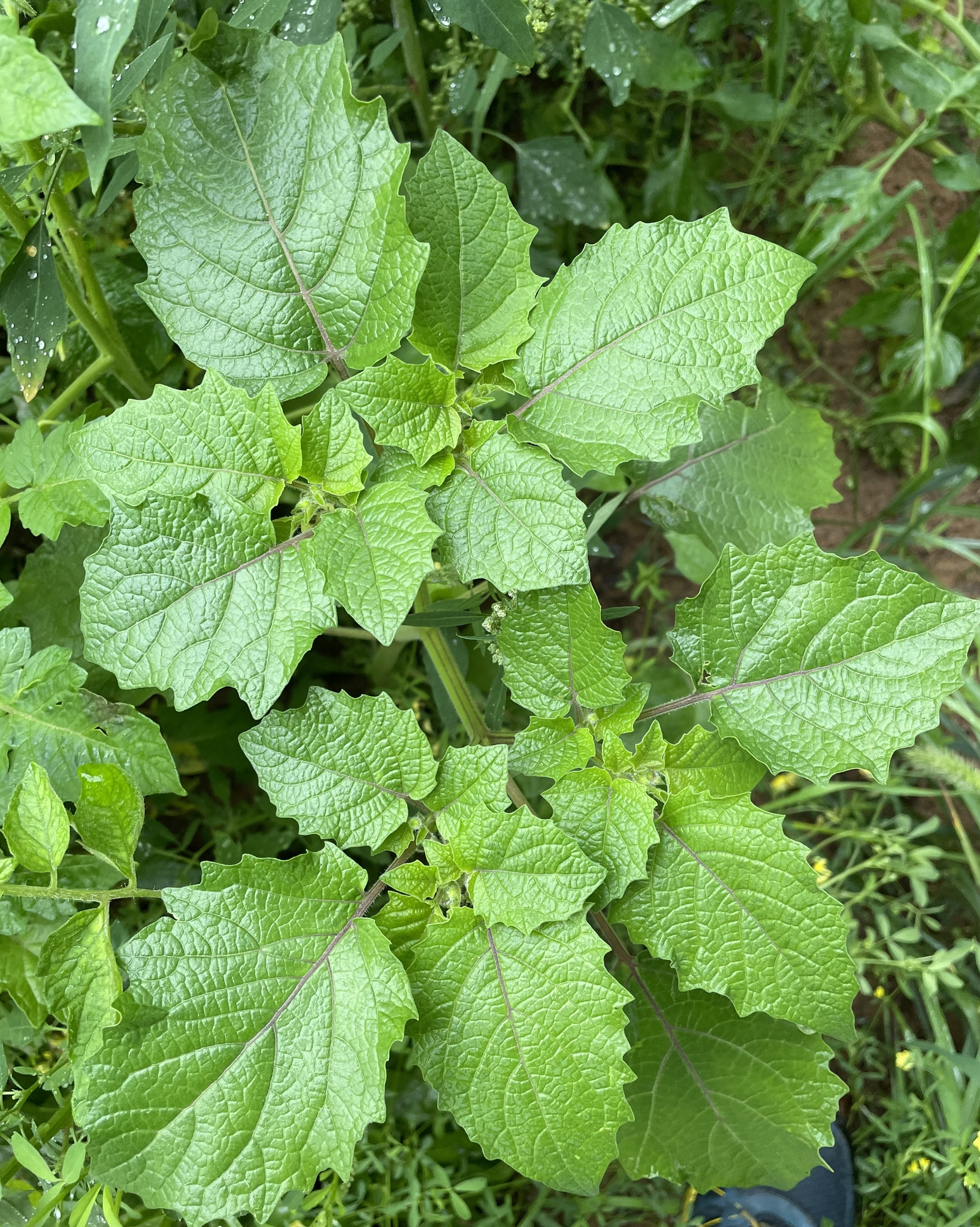
- Strawberry Ground-cherry (Physalis grisea)

Scientific classification
- Kingdom: Plantae
- Clade: Tracheophytes
- Clade: Angiosperms
- Clade: Eudicots
- Clade: Asterids
- Order: Solanales
- Family: Solanaceae
- Genus: Physalis
- Species: P. grisea

Binomial name
- Physalis grisea (Waterf.) M.Martínez

= Physalis grisea =

Species of fruit and plant

Physalis grisea is a species of flowering plant in the nightshade family known by common names including strawberry ground-cherry, downy ground-cherry, and strawberry-tomato in English. The name downy ground-cherry is due to the soft hairs that give the plant a gray cast. This downy gray coloration is the origin of the specific epithet grisea. Physalis grisea is native to northeastern North America.

== Description ==
Physalis grisea has frequently been incorrectly described as Physalis pruinosa. Physalis grisea has also been confused with Physalis pubescens.

The leaves of Physalis grisea have net-like venation patterns, and the fruit is rust-colored. The leaves are simple, alternate, and the edge of the leaf blade has teeth. The leaves dry orange. There are five petals in the flower, which are fused. The corolla of Physalis grisea features brown spots on the throat, and the fruiting calyx as long as broad and is acute at its apex with blue anthers.

== Cultivation ==
Physalis grisea is cultivated for its berries, which are used in pies and preserves.
