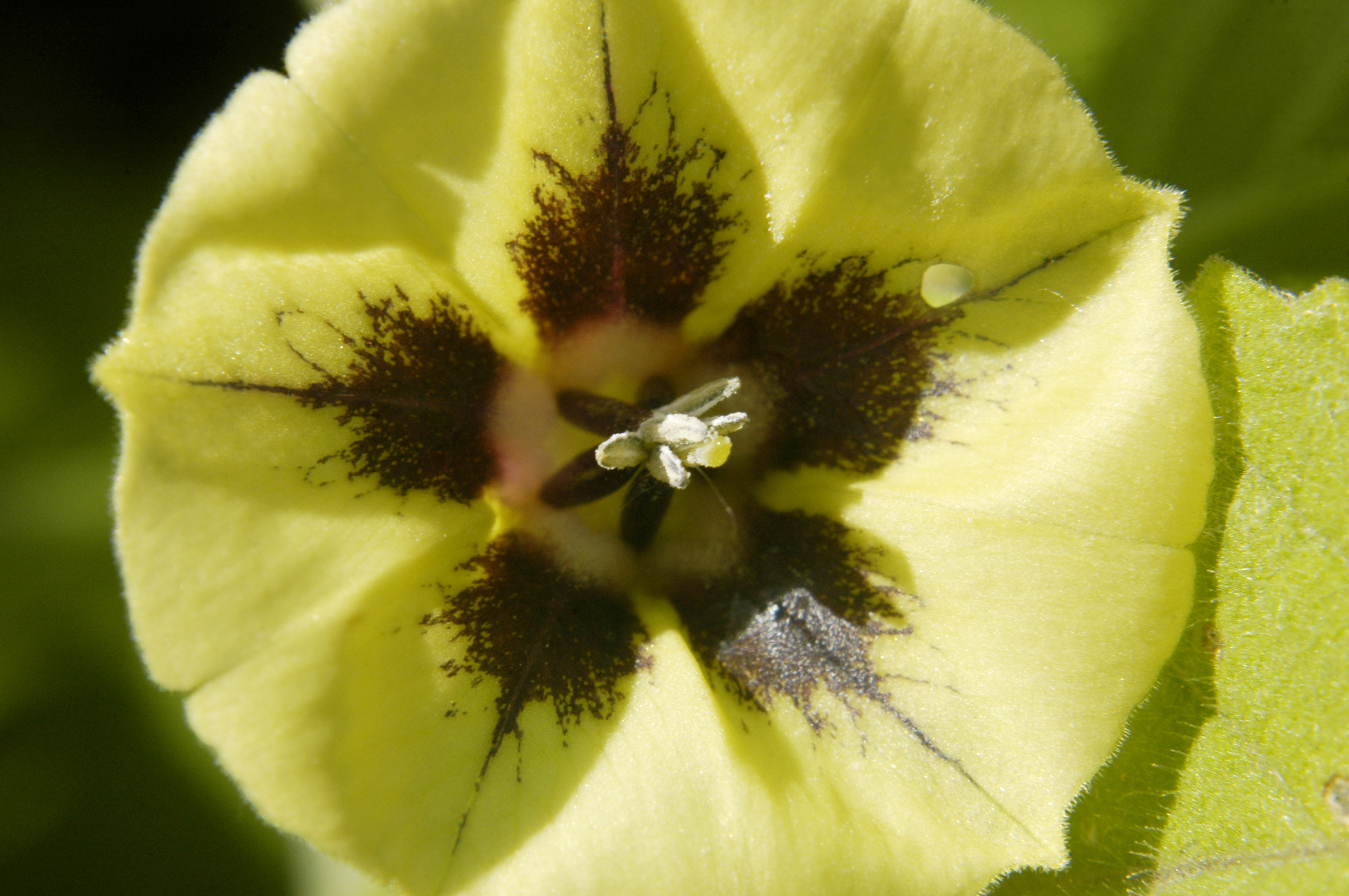
- var. subglabrata

Conservation status
- Secure (NatureServe)

Scientific classification
- Kingdom: Plantae
- Clade: Tracheophytes
- Clade: Angiosperms
- Clade: Eudicots
- Clade: Asterids
- Order: Solanales
- Family: Solanaceae
- Genus: Physalis
- Species: P. longifolia

Binomial name
- Physalis longifolia Nutt.

= Physalis longifolia =

Species of flowering plant

Physalis longifolia, known by the common names common groundcherry, longleaf groundcherry, and wild tomatillo, is a species of flowering plant in the nightshade family, Solanaceae. It is native to North America, where it is native to eastern Canada, much of the continental United States, and northern Mexico. It has also been noted as an introduced species in other regions, including parts of the United States outside its native range. In some areas, such as California, it is an occasional noxious weed.

There are two varieties:

- P. longifolia var. longifolia
- P. longifolia var. subglabrata (syn. P. subglabrata)

== Description ==
This species is a perennial herb growing 20–60 cm (7.9–23.6 in) tall with somewhat oval-shaped leaf blades 4–7 cm (1.6–2.8 in) long borne on petioles. Flowers occur in the leaf axils. The bell-shaped corolla is up to 2 cm (0.79 in) wide and is yellow with purplish markings around the center. The husk covering the berry is up to 3.5 cm (1.4 in) long with ten veins.

== Uses ==
The yellow-green fruit is edible. The fresh fruit "tastes like an effervescent, under-ripened strawberry", and the dried berry "tastes like a cross between a raisin and dried cranberry." Native American groups used it for food. The Puebloan peoples called the fruits charoka and shuma charoka and ate them fresh or cooked.

The Zuni people referred to the plant and its relative Physalis hederifolia as Ke’tsitokia, and probably used them in similar ways. Women grew it in household gardens. The tomato-flavored berry was boiled and ground with onion, coriander, and chilis to make a dish considered to be a delicacy. The fruit was also dried and mixed into flour for bread. Today the Zuni use the closely related common tomatillo (P. philadelphica) in a sauce recipe derived from the traditional dishes that used wild species.

The var. subglabrata has been listed in government compendia of Louisiana restricted taxa believed to be hallucinogenic, but this is likely inaccurate.

P. longifolia is easy to grow in trials and produces a flavorful fruit.
