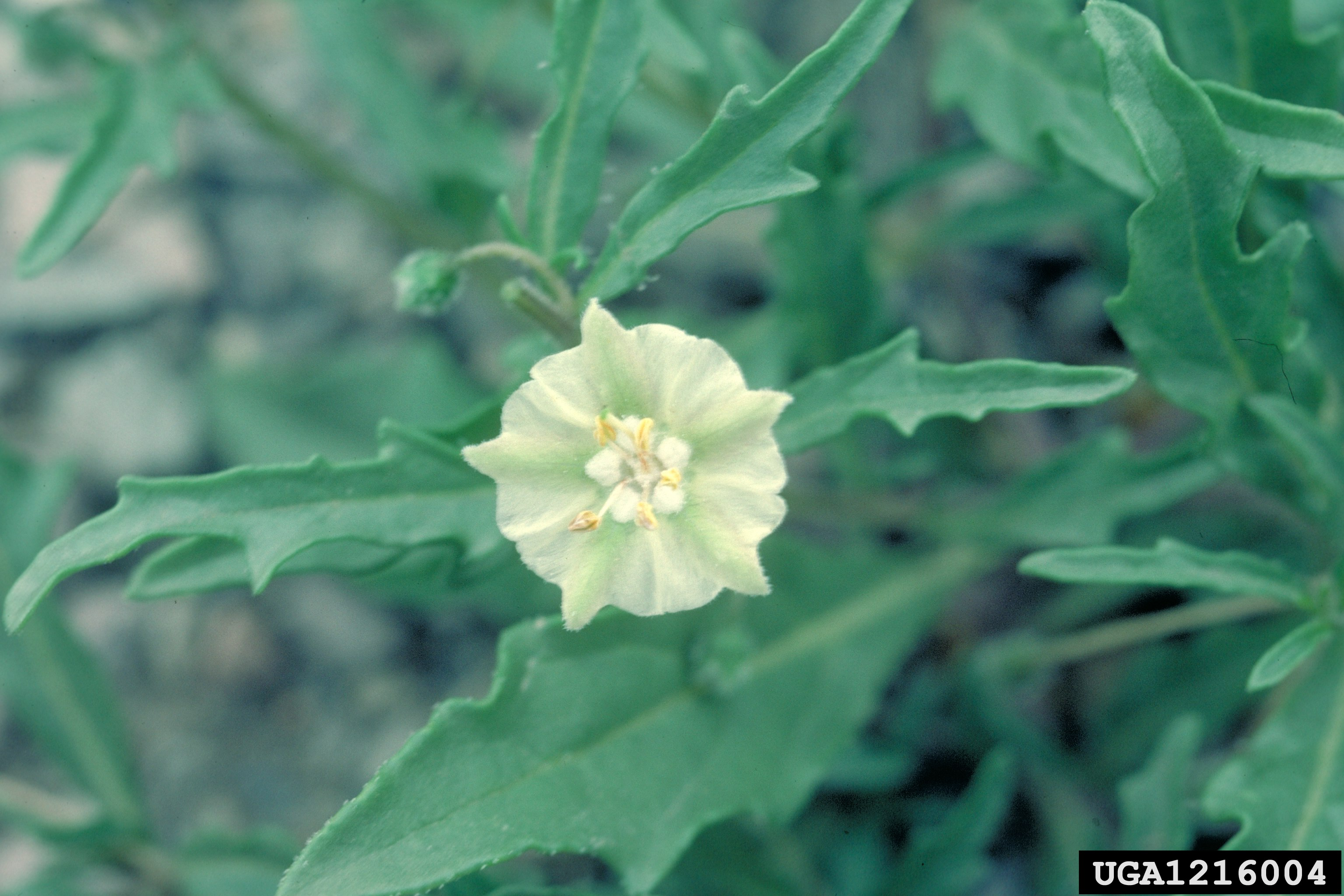

Scientific classification
- Kingdom: Plantae
- Clade: Tracheophytes
- Clade: Angiosperms
- Clade: Eudicots
- Clade: Asterids
- Order: Solanales
- Family: Solanaceae
- Genus: Physalis
- Species: P. virginiana

Binomial name
- Physalis virginiana Mill.

= Physalis virginiana =

Species of flowering plant

Physalis virginiana, the Virginia groundcherry, is a rhizomatous perennial with a deeply buried stem base. It is found mostly in eastern North America as far west as Wyoming.

== Description ==
The Virginia groundcherry is mostly found from early July to September in native areas. It prefers moist slightly sandy soil where grazing is light. Each base typically supports one to six hairy stems that are forked with ascending branches. It leaves are palish green and lance shaped. Small greenish flowers grow on each of its stems. The flowers form a five angled bladder like structure that surrounds the plants half inch diameter sized fruit. It has been found to grow in height from 8 to 12 inches.

== Edibility ==
Virginia Groundcherry is one of the edible North American species. Being a member of the nightshade family, unripe fruit can be poisonous. When ripe, the fruit should be an orangey-yellow color. Flavor, when fresh off the bush, is almost candy-like, but changes after a short time into something more akin to a cherry tomato.

== Aggressive species ==
The Virginia groundcherry is native through much of the United States as well as Manitoba, Ontario, Quebec, and New Brunswick. It is considered rare in parts of Ontario. However, along with other members of the genus Physalis it is an aggressive species in some parts of the United States. A specific example of the aggressive capabilities of P. virginiana is its effect on soybean production in Kentucky. The berries are often crushed during the soybean harvest which allows the Physalis seeds to cling to the soybean seeds. Certification standards for soybean production requires that no more than 62/ha black nightshade or groundcherry plants should be found at inspection. This problem has led to scientific studies on ways to reduce black nightshade and groundcherry populations around soybean farms. One such study found that germination of these plants was reduced in the dark and in lower pH substrates. The groundcherry plants were found to be less affected by moisture reduction.

== Hybridization ==
The hybridization potential of P. virginiana has also been studied. One such study found that the P. virginiana population was decreasing in an area as a hybrid of P. virginiana and Physalis heterophylla. The researchers believed that the increased hybridization of P. virginiana is possibly due to scarcity of P. virginiana pollen. Another possibility they gave was that the hybrid plants may be better suited for certain environments.

== Medicinal potential ==
Native Americans traditionally used various Physalis species for eye infections, treating open wounds, and gastrointestinal symptoms.

Physalis species are now studied for their potential health benefits. One study done specifically on P. virginiana was intended to investigate its antibacterial potential. The overall purpose of this study was to identify the chemical compounds of P. virginiana that could be used to make antibiotics. The researchers introduced extracts from the plant to twelve different bacteria cultures. They found that extracts from the plant inhibited the growth of eight out of the twelve strains of bacteria. The identified the chemical compound in the plant that inhibits bacteria growth to be withanolide. The whole plant showed bacteria inhibiting properties but extracts from the shoots of the plants had the most effect, and extracts from the roots of the plant showed the least effect.
