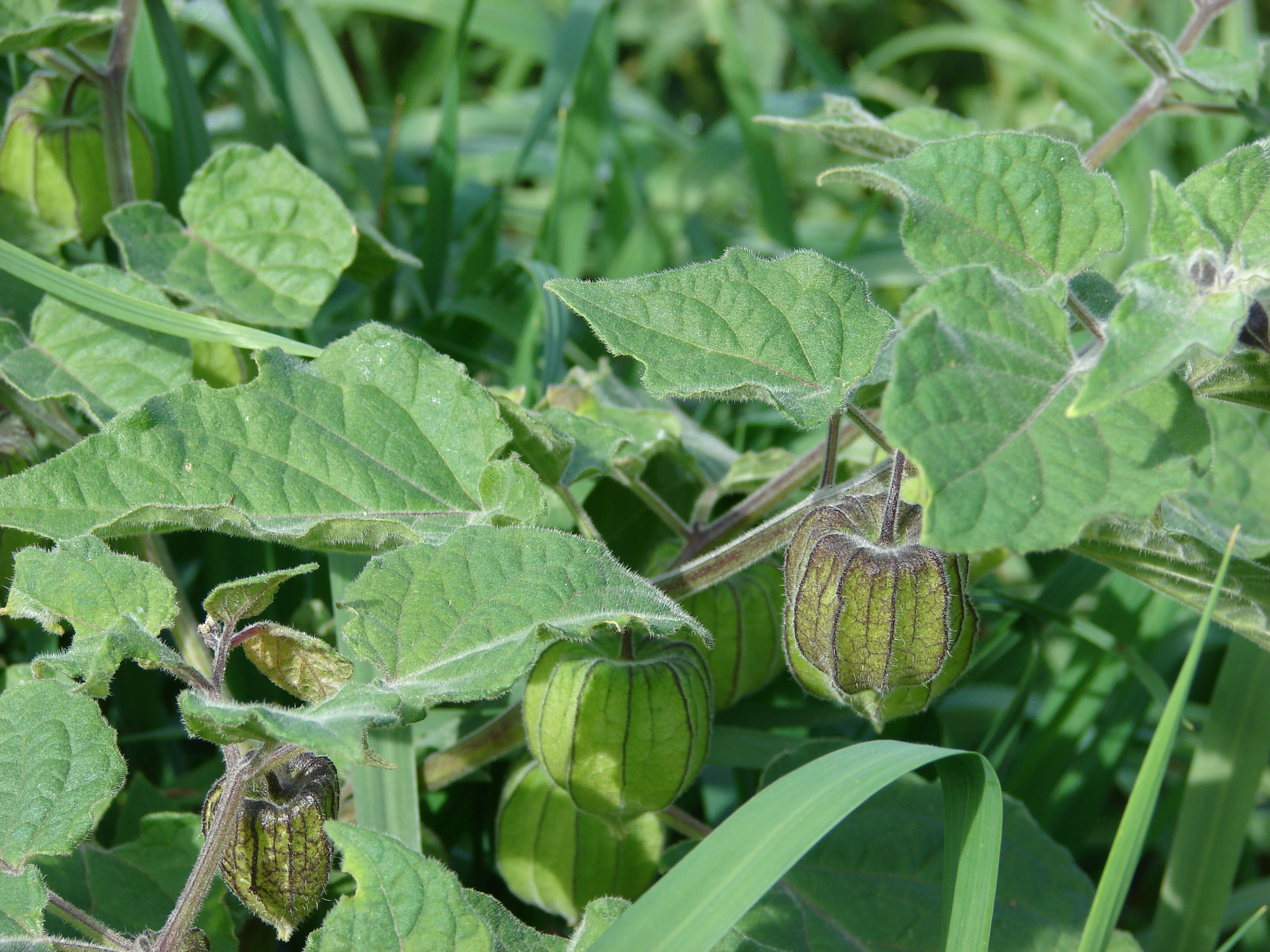
- Cape gooseberry (Physalis peruviana) leaves and fruit

Scientific classification
- Kingdom: Plantae
- Clade: Tracheophytes
- Clade: Angiosperms
- Clade: Eudicots
- Clade: Asterids
- Order: Solanales
- Family: Solanaceae
- Subfamily: Solanoideae
- Tribe: Physaleae
- Genus: Physalis; L. (1753), nom. cons.

Type species
- Physalis pubescens L.

Species
- About 75–90; see text

Synonyms
- Alicabon Raf. (1838); Boberella E.H.L.Krause (1903), nom. superfl.; Epetorhiza Steud. (1840), not validly publ.; Herschellia T.E.Bowdich (1825); Margaranthus Schltdl. (1838); Pentaphitrum Rchb. (1841)

= Physalis =

Physalis Temporal range: Early Eocene (Ypresian) to recent, 52–0 Ma

Genus of flowering plants

Physalis (/ˈfaɪsəlɪs/, /fɪ-/, /faɪˈseɪlɪs/, /-ˈsæ-/, from Ancient Greek: φυσαλλίς phusallís 'bladder') is a genus of approximately 75 to 90 flowering plants in the nightshade family (Solanaceae), which are native to the Americas and Australasia. At least 46 species are endemic to Mexico. Cultivated and weedy species have been introduced worldwide. A defining feature of Physalis is a large, papery husk derived from the calyx, which partly or fully encloses the fruit. Many species bear edible fruit, and some species are cultivated.

The typical Physalis fruit is similar to a firm tomato in texture, and like a sweet, tangy grape in flavor. Some species, such as the Cape gooseberry and tomatillo, have been bred into many cultivars with varying flavors, from tart to sweet to savory. Nations including Colombia, India, and Mexico have a significant economic trade in Physalis fruit. The fruits of many species are generically referred to as physalis, groundcherries, husk tomatoes, husk cherries, poha berries, and golden berries.

== Description ==
Physalis species are herbaceous plants growing to 0.4 to 3.0 m (1 to 10 ft) tall, similar to the common tomato, a plant of the same family, but usually with a stiffer, more upright stem. They can be either annual or perennial. Most require full sun and fairly warm to hot conditions. Some species are sensitive to frost, but others tolerate cold when dormant in winter.

=== Fossil record ===
A 52-million-year-old fossil fruit of Physalis has been found in Patagonia, named as Physalis infinemundi.

== Cultivation and uses ==
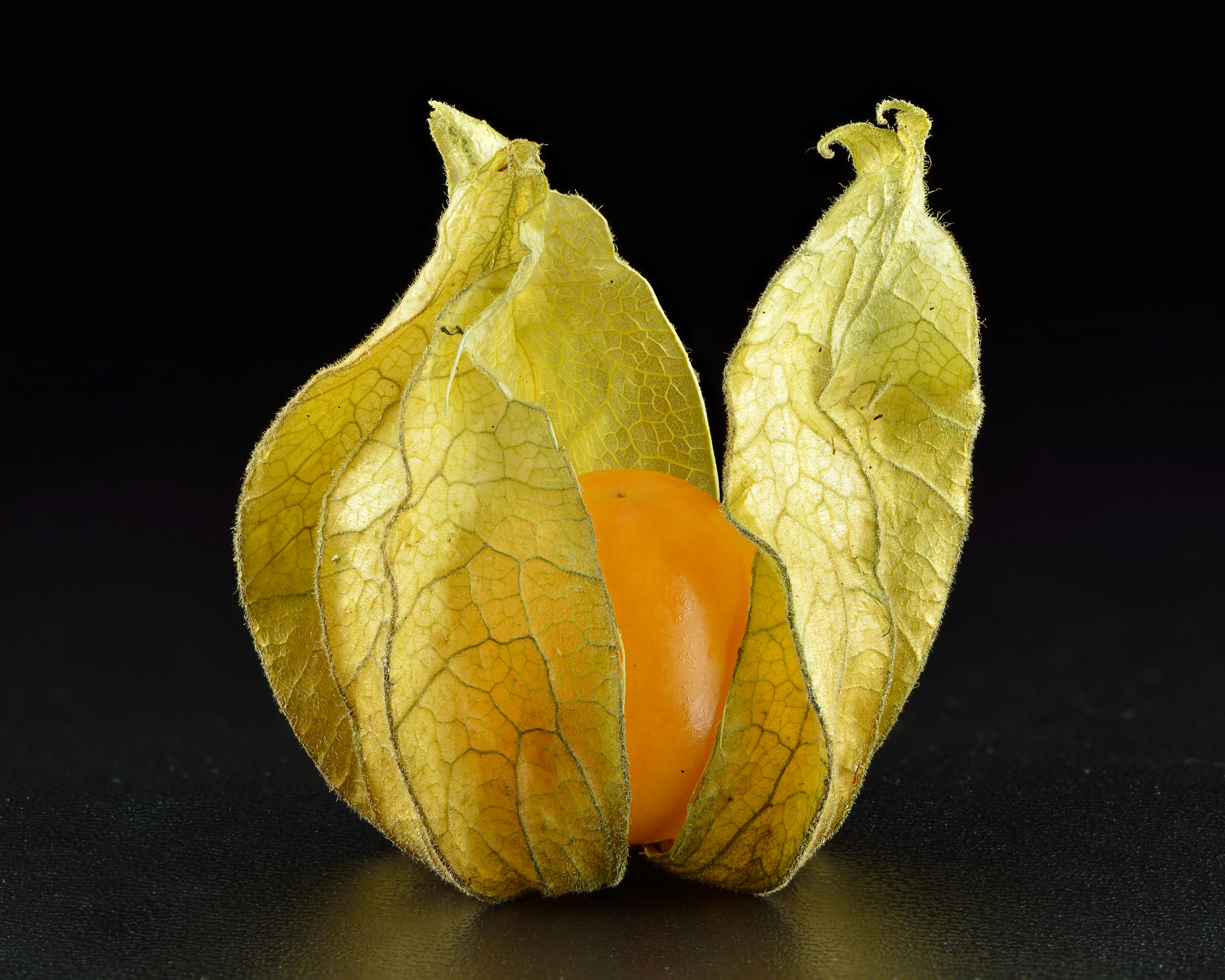
Physalis peruviana fruit with calyx open

Estimates for the earliest use of Physalis for human consumption range from 900 to 5000 BCE. Archaeological sites support the historical use of Physalis as a food for indigenous people in what is now northern Mexico and portions of the United States.

Physalis fruit are rich in cryptoxanthin. The fruit can be used like the tomato. Once extracted from its husk, it can be eaten raw and used in salads. Some varieties are added to desserts, used as flavoring, made into fruit preserves, or dried and used like raisins. They contain pectin and can be used in pie filling. Ground cherries are called poha in the Hawaiian language, and poha jam and preserves are traditional desserts made from Physalis plants grown on the Hawaiian Islands.

A 2013 literature review identified more than one hundred works with medical use of various Physalis species from the Americas. Preparations included all parts of the plants (fruits, leaves, flowers, stems, and roots) and took forms including decoction, infusion, and soaking. Herbal preparations are known to be administered internally and externally.

Physalis plants grow in most soil types and do very well in poor soils and in pots. They require moisture until fruiting. Plants are susceptible to many of the common tomato diseases and pests, and other pests such as aphids, whiteflies, spider mites, and the false potato beetle (Leptinotarsa juncta) also attack them. Propagation is by seed.

In the United States, Louisiana erroneously classifies Physalis subglabrata (smooth groundcherry) as a hallucinogenic plant, and its cultivation for other than ornamental purposes is outlawed under State Act 159 of 2005. In the Gran Chaco region of South America, the consumption of the different species of Physalis for food has declined due to sociocultural and environmental changes. Factors generally stem from the ongoing effects of colonization, including loss of ancestral territories to forestry exploitation and industrial agriculture as well as the decline of seasonal human migrations which were formerly part of the cycle of propagation, harvest, and consumption of Physalis.

== Subgenera and sections ==
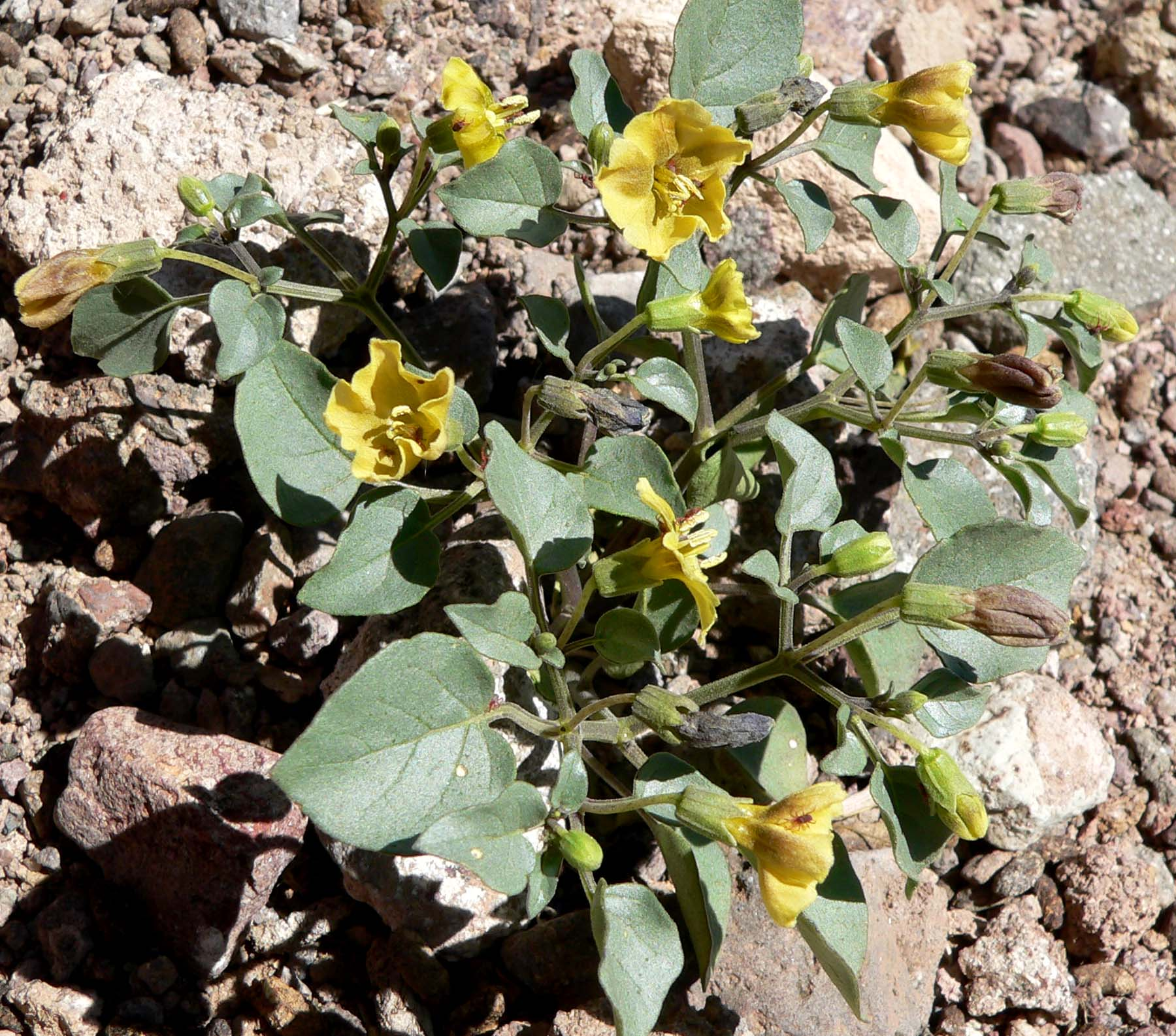
Yellow nightshade groundcherry (Physalis crassifolia)

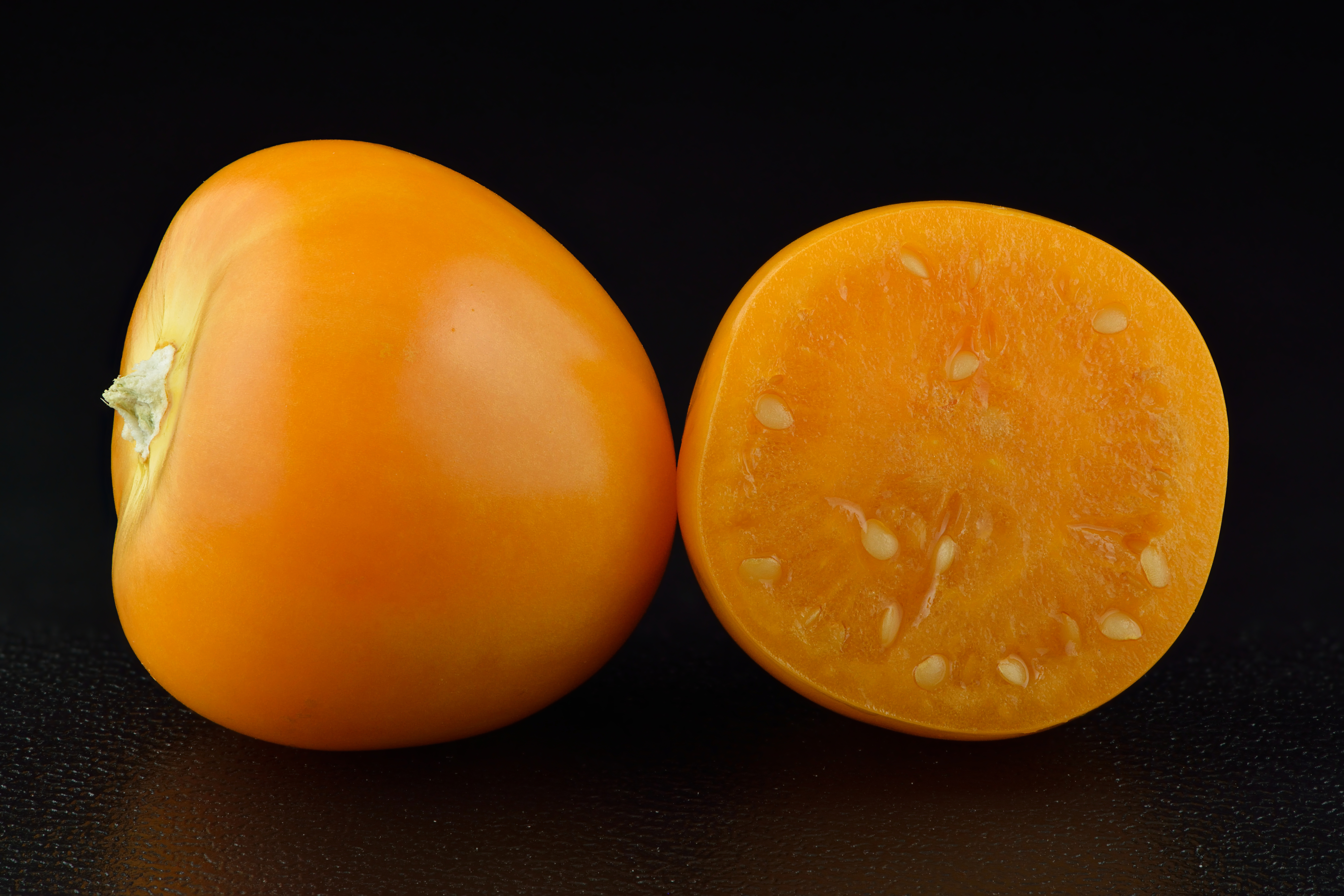
Physalis peruviana fruits

Physalis is divided into subgenera and sections. The taxonomy of Physalis is still an active area of taxonomic classification. About 75 to 90 species are placed in the genus.

In 1831, Nees von Esenbeck was among the first researchers to complete a review of the Physalis species that had been described until that time in order to identify synonyms and subtaxa within the genus. In 1837, George Don named the sections proposed by Nees von Esenbeck, including three names that are still in use: Physalodendron for woody species, Eurostorhiza for perennials with rhizomatous roots, and Epeteiorhiza for annual species.

Michel Félix Dunal in 1852 and Per Axel Rydberg in 1896 also published efforts to subdivide Physalis, although these were not generally consistent with the taxonomy advocated by Esenbeck and Don. Rydberg's taxonomy identified seven species groups within a section Rydberg called Euphysalis; these groups became the basis of sections which remain in use.

Margaret Y. Menzel's research in the 20th century provided new insights into Physalis taxonomy, including the results of her crossing experiments with 28 Physalis species and their karyological data. The groups of species previously set up by Rydberg were raised to sections by this research. A summary of all taxonomic research regarding the genus was published in 1989 by Radovan Hendrych, and the most recent major taxonomic publications were made in 1994 and 1999 by Mahinda Martínez.

A genetic study by Whitson and Manos in 2005 found evidence that supports the Physalodendron and Rydbergis subgenera. The same research indicated that evidence was weak for most of the recognized species sections within the Rydbergis subgenus, but that other subgroupings might be appropriate instead. This and other phylogenic research led to the Whitson proposal in 2016 to establish Alkekengi officinarum as the type of a new genus rather than the type species of Physalis.

=== Genetics and breeding ===
The basic chromosome number for Physalis species is 12, and most Physalis species are diploid with 2n = 24. This basic number is typical for members of the Solanaceae family. Research has identified several species that have experienced polyploidy, including Physalis angulata, Physalis floridana, Physalis pubescens, and Physalis peruviana.

Physalis species are generally self-compatible and autogamous, although some may exhibit self-incompatibility and require pollen from another plant to bear fruit or produce seed. A study in 2022 found self-compatibility for all seven Physalis that were observed, which included Physalis peruviana and Physalis ixocarpa. The same study found that fruit fixation and viable seed formation occurred in most inter-specific crosses. The authors did not grow offspring to the second generation.

Menzel performed crosses between Physalis species to assess hybridization in 1951 which showed that perennial species are prone to hybridization while annual Physalis species exhibited barriers between crossing. Hinton identified natural hybridization events between Physalis virginianaMill. and Physalis heterophyllaNees, which Hinton hypothesized could be the result of self-incompatibility and lack of Physalis virginiana pollen. Sullivan reported in 1985 that natural hybridization rarely occurs among four species from the Physalis viscosa complex.

=== Physalis subgenus Physalodendron ===
Authority: (G. Don) M. Martinez

- Physalis arborescens
- Physalis melanocystis

=== Physalis subgenus Rydbergis ===
Authority: Hendrych

==== Section Angulatae ====
Authority: (Rydberg) M. Martinez

- Physalis acutifolia (Miers) Sandw. – sharp-leaved groundcherry, Wright groundcherry
- Physalis ampla Waterfall
- Physalis angulata L. – cut-leaved groundcherry, lance-leaved groundcherry, camapu
- Physalis carnosa Standley
- Physalis crassifolia Benth. – thick-leaved groundcherry, yellow nightshade groundcherry
- Physalis ixocarpa Brot – tomatillo
- Physalis lagascae Roem. & Schult.
- Physalis microcarpa Urb. & Eckman
- Physalis minima Linnaeus – pygmy groundcherry, native gooseberry (Australia)
- Physalis philadelphica Lam. – tomatillo, Mexican groundcherry, jamberry, Mexican tomato, tomate de cáscara, tomate de fresadilla, tomate milpero, tomate verde
- Physalis solanacea (Schlechtendal) Axelius
- Physalis sulphurea (Fernald) Waterfall

==== Section Campanulae ====
Authority: M. Martinez

- Physalis campanula Standl. & Steyerm.
- Physalis glutinosa Schltdl.

==== Section Coztomatae ====
Authority: M. Martinez

- Physalis aggregata Waterfall
- Physalis angustior Waterfall
- Physalis chenopodifolia Lam.
- Physalis coztomatl Moc. & Sessé ex Dunal
- Physalis greenmanii Waterfall
- Physalis hintonii Waterfall
- Physalis jaliscensis Waterfall
- Physalis lassa Standley & Steyerm.
- Physalis lignescens Waterfall
- Physalis longilobaVargas, M. Martínez & Dávila
- Physalis longipedicellata Waterfall
- Physalis mcvaughii Waterfall
- Physalis orizabae Dunal
- Physalis pennellii Waterfall
- Physalis philippiensis Fernald
- Physalis pringlei Greenman
- Physalis sancti-josephi Dunal
- Physalis subrepens Waterfall

==== Section Epeteiorhiza ====
Authority: G. Don

- Physalis angustiphysa Waterfall
- Physalis cordata Mill. – heart-leaved groundcherry
- Physalis grisea (Waterfall) Martínez – strawberry-tomato
- Physalis ignota Britton
- Physalis latiphysa Waterfall – broad-leaved groundcherry
- Physalis leptophylla B.L. Rob. & Greenm.
- Physalis minuta Griggs
- Physalis missouriensis Mackenzie & Bush – Missouri groundcherry
- Physalis neomexicana Rydberg
- Physalis nicandroides Schltdl.
- Physalis patula Mill.
- Physalis porrecta Waterfall
- Physalis pruinosa L. – groundcherry, husk tomato

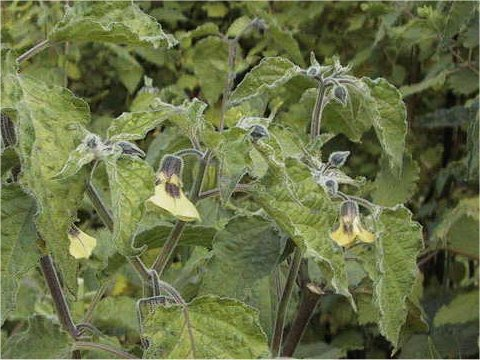
Physalis pruinosa plants in bloom

- Physalis pubescens L. – golden strawberry, Chinese lantern
- Physalis tamayoi Vargas, M. Martínez & Dávila

==== Section Lanceolatae ====
Authority: (Rydberg) M. Y. Menzel

- Physalis arenicola Kearney – cypress-headed groundcherry
- Physalis caudella Standl. – southwestern groundcherry
- Physalis fendleri A. Gray
- Physalis gracilis Miers
- Physalis hastatula Waterfall
- Physalis hederifolia A.Gray – ivy-leaved groundcherry
- Physalis heterophylla Nees – clammy groundcherry
- Physalis ingrata Standley
- Physalis lanceolata Michaux
- Physalis longifolia Nuttall – common groundcherry, long-leaved groundcherry
- Physalis macrosperma Pyne & E.L.Bridges & Orzel
- Physalis muelleri Waterfall
- Physalis peruviana L. – Cape gooseberry, Peruvian groundcherry, Inca berry, uchuva (Colombia), poha
- Physalis pumila Nuttall – dwarf groundcherry
- Physalis queretaroensis M. Martinez & L. Hernandez
- Physalis sordida Fernald
- Physalis virginiana Mill. – Virginia groundcherry
- Physalis volubilis Waterfall

==== Section Rydbergae ====
Authority: M. Martinez

- Physalis minimaculata Waterfall
- Physalis rydbergii Fernald

==== Section Tehuacanae ====
Authority: M. Martinez

- Physalis tehuacanensis Waterfall

==== Section Viscosae ====
Authority: (Rydberg) M. Y. Menzel

- Physalis angustifolia Nuttall – coastal groundcherry
- Physalis cinerascens (Dunal) A.S. Hitchc. – small-flowered groundcherry
- Physalis × elliottii Kunze
- Physalis × elliottii nothovar. glabra Waterfall
- Physalis mollis Nuttall – field groundcherry
- Physalis vestita Waterfall
- Physalis viscosa Linnaeus – grape groundcherry, star-haired groundcherry
- Physalis walteri Nuttall – Walter's groundcherry
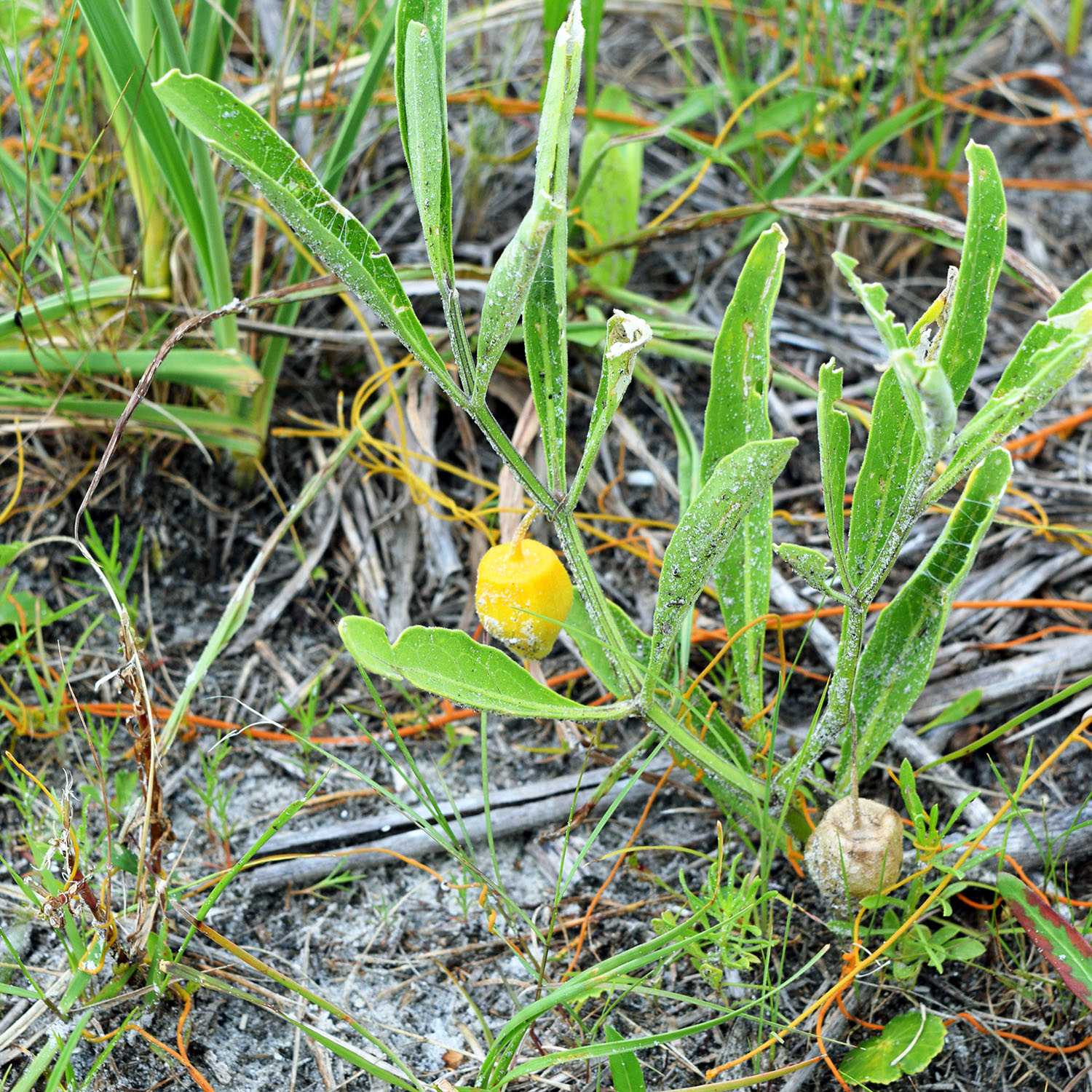
  Walter's groundcherry plant with fruit at Honeymoon Island State Park, Florida

=== Physalis species not assigned to a subgenus or section ===
- †Physalis infinemundi Wilf et al. 2017 – Extinct species typified by a fossil from the Ypresian Era of Patagonia

=== Formerly placed here ===
- Alkekengi officinarum Moench. – Chinese lantern, Japanese lantern, bladder-cherry, winter-cherry, hōzuki (as P. alkekengi L.)
- Calliphysalis carpenteri (Riddell) Whitson – Carpenter's groundcherry (as P. carpenteri Riddell)
- Darcyanthus spruceanus (Hunz.) Hunz. ex N.A.Harriman (as P. spruceana Hunz.)
- Deprea orinocensis (Kunth) Raf. (as P. orinocensis Kunth)
- Leucophysalis grandiflora (Hook.) Rydb. (as P. grandiflora Hook.)
- Quincula lobata (Torr.) Raf. (as P. lobata Torr.)
- Salpichroa origanifolia (Lam.) Baill. (as P. origanifolia Lam.)
- Withania somnifera (L.) Dunal (as P. somnifera Linnaeus)
