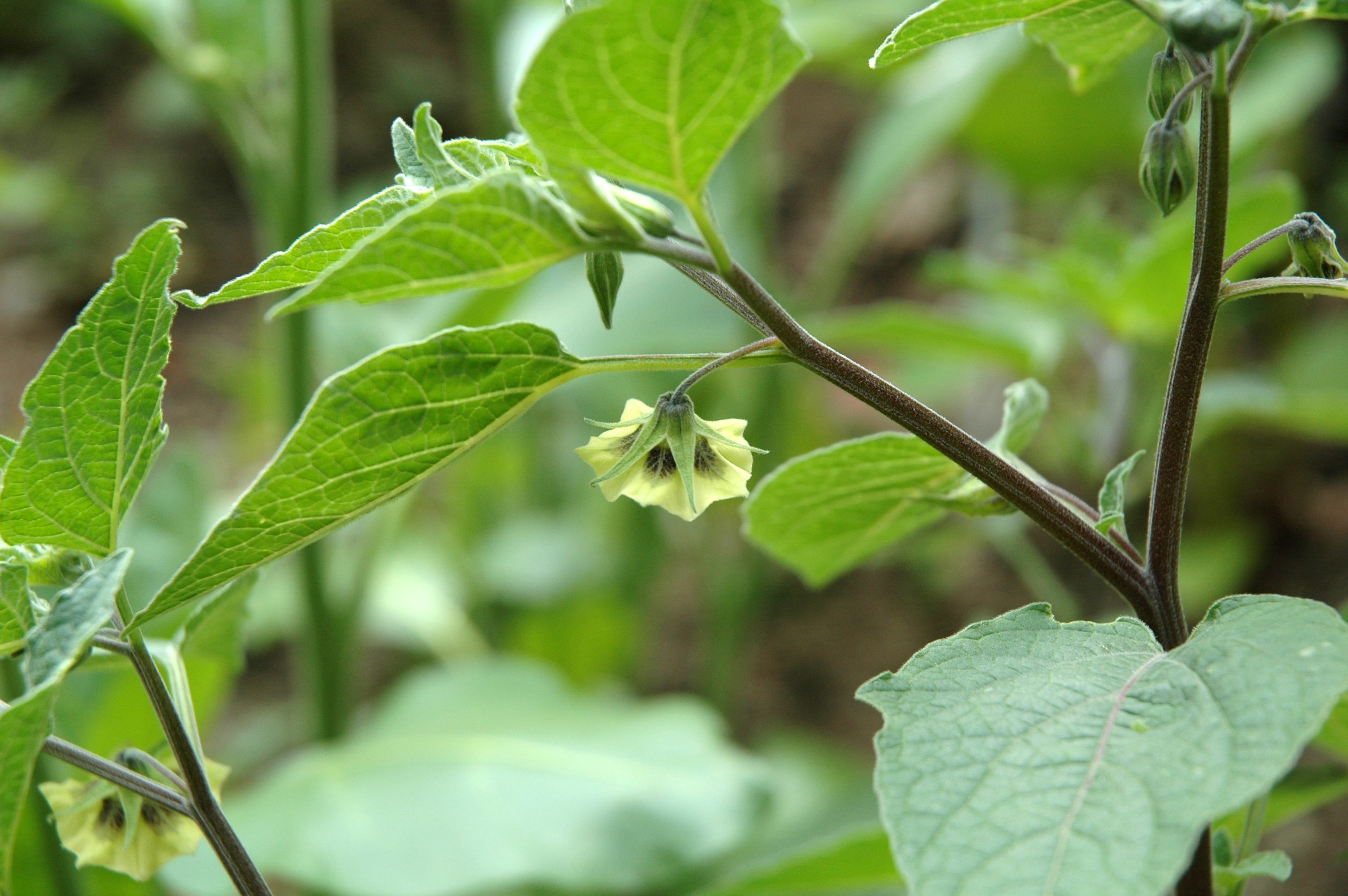

Conservation status
- Least Concern (IUCN 3.1)

Scientific classification
- Kingdom: Plantae
- Clade: Tracheophytes
- Clade: Angiosperms
- Clade: Eudicots
- Clade: Asterids
- Order: Solanales
- Family: Solanaceae
- Genus: Physalis
- Species: P. coztomatl

Binomial name
- Physalis coztomatl Moc. & Sessé ex Dunal

= Physalis coztomatl =

Species of flowering plant

Physalis coztomatl is a plant species in the genus Physalis. It produces edible orange-yellow fruits, but is rarely cultivated. The leaves are oval-shaped. It is native to America; the Aztecs used it medicinally. It contains labdane diterpenes, and was the first species in Physalis in which they were found.
