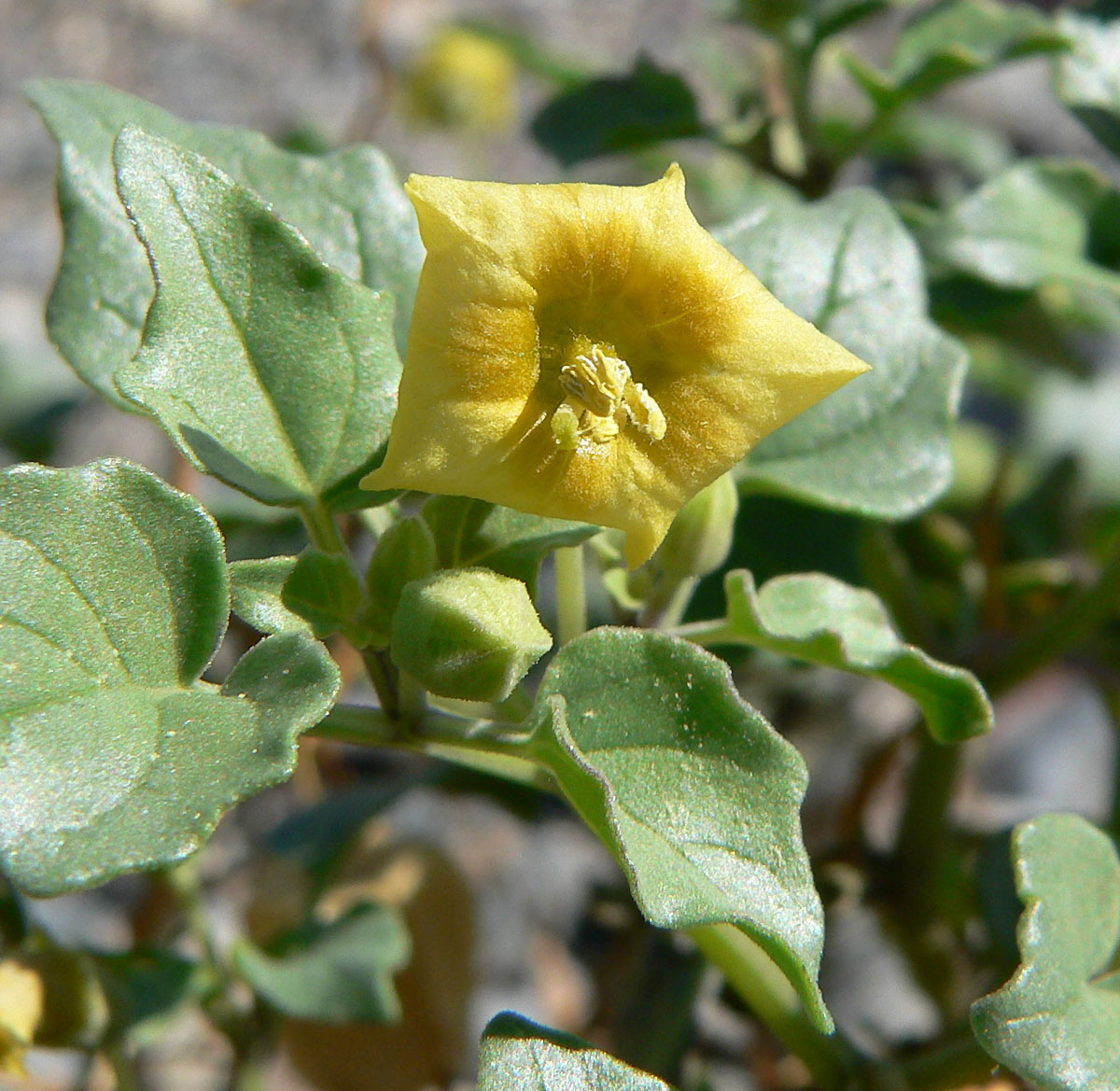

Conservation status
- Secure (NatureServe)

Scientific classification
- Kingdom: Plantae
- Clade: Tracheophytes
- Clade: Angiosperms
- Clade: Eudicots
- Clade: Asterids
- Order: Solanales
- Family: Solanaceae
- Genus: Physalis
- Species: P. crassifolia

Binomial name
- Physalis crassifolia Benth.

Synonyms
- Physalis greenei

= Physalis crassifolia =

Species of flowering plant

Physalis crassifolia is a species of flowering plant in the nightshade family known by the common names yellow nightshade groundcherry and thick-leaf ground-cherry. It is native to the southwestern United States and northern Mexico, where it can be found in rocky, dry desert and mountain habitat. This is a perennial herb producing a ridged, angular, branching stem approaching 80 cm long, taking a clumped, matted, or erect form. The fleshy oval leaves are 1 to 3 cm long and have smooth, wavy, or bluntly toothed edges. The herbage is glandular and coated in short hairs. The yellow flowers growing from the leaf axils are widely bell-shaped, vaguely five-lobed, and around 2 cm wide. The star-shaped calyx of sepals at the base of the flower enlarges as the fruit develops, becoming an inflated, angled lanternlike structure about 2 cm long, which contains the berry.
