= Physalis caudella =

Scientific classification
- Kingdom: Plantae
- Clade: Tracheophytes
- Clade: Angiosperms
- Clade: Eudicots
- Clade: Asterids
- Order: Solanales
- Family: Solanaceae
- Genus: Physalis
- Species: P. caudella

Binomial name
- Physalis caudella Standl.

Species of flowering plant

Physalis caudella, the southwestern groundcherry or tomatillo chiquito, is a plant in the family Solanaceae, native to Arizona, Sonora and Chihuahua. The purple-green fruits are small but edible.
