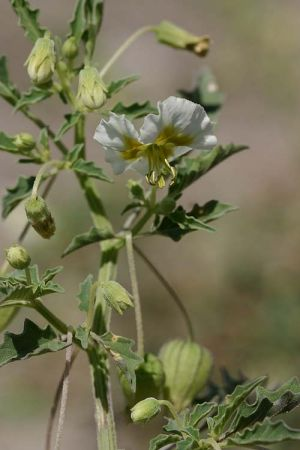

Conservation status
- Least Concern (IUCN 3.1)

- Secure (NatureServe)

Scientific classification
- Kingdom: Plantae
- Clade: Tracheophytes
- Clade: Angiosperms
- Clade: Eudicots
- Clade: Asterids
- Order: Solanales
- Family: Solanaceae
- Genus: Physalis
- Species: P. acutifolia

Binomial name
- Physalis acutifolia (Miers) Sandwith

Synonyms
- Homotypic Synonyms: Saracha acutifolia Miers; Witheringia acutifolia (Miers) Miers; Heterotypic Synonyms: Physalis dentata Pav. ex Dunal; Physalis wrightii A.Gray

= Physalis acutifolia =

Species of flowering plant

Physalis acutifolia is a species of flowering plant in the nightshade family, Solanaceae. It is sometimes referred to by the common names Sharp-leaf Ground-cherry, and Wright's Ground-cherry. It is native to the United States in Alabama, Arizona, California, Georgia, Mississippi, New Mexico, and Texas, as well as Mexico.

It grows in many habitats, including disturbed areas. It is sometimes a weed in agricultural fields, but it is generally not weedy in wild habitat. This is an annual herb producing a branching stem up to a meter tall. The lance-shaped to oval leaves are up to 12 cm long and have edges lined with shallow, smooth teeth. The herbage is coated thinly in hairs appressed flat against the surface. The flowers growing from the leaf axils are round and flat-faced and sometimes over 2 cm wide. They are white to pale yellow with wide, bright yellow centers. The five stamens are each tipped with an anther about 3 mm long. The star-shaped calyx of sepals at the base of the flower enlarges as the fruit develops, becoming an inflated, ribbed lantern-shaped structure about 2 cm long which contains the berry.
