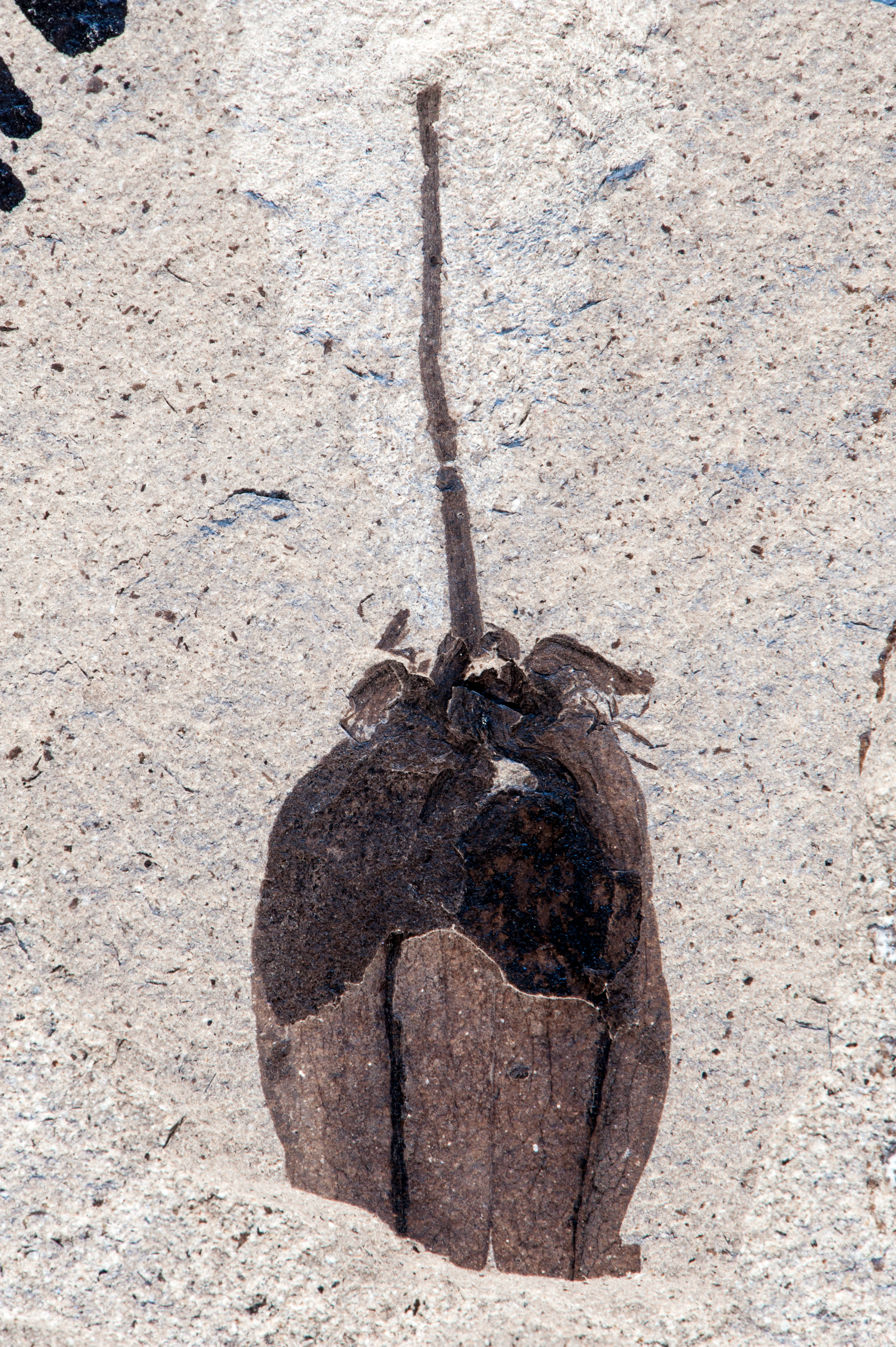
- Fossil of Physalis infinemundi

Scientific classification
- Kingdom: Plantae
- Clade: Tracheophytes
- Clade: Angiosperms
- Clade: Eudicots
- Clade: Asterids
- Order: Solanales
- Family: Solanaceae
- Genus: Physalis
- Species: †P. infinemundi

Binomial name
- †Physalis infinemundi Wilf et al. 2017

= Physalis infinemundi =

Physalis infinemundi Temporal range: Ypresian

Species of flowering plant

Physalis infinemundi is an extinct species of the genus Physalis (which includes Cape gooseberry, tomatillo, and ground cherries) known from two fossilised fruit found in the Laguna del Hunco Formation of Chubut Province, Argentina dating to the Eocene, around 52 million years old. The species name derives from "in fine mundi" means "at the end of the earth" referring to the fact that it grew in the far south. The fossil was considerably older than the diversification ages predicted by previous molecular clock studies of Solanaceae, which estimated that the family as a whole originated 30 million years ago. The fossils are very similar to modern Physalis species, with 5 distinct lobes. The environment at the time of deposition is thought to have been a rainforest.
