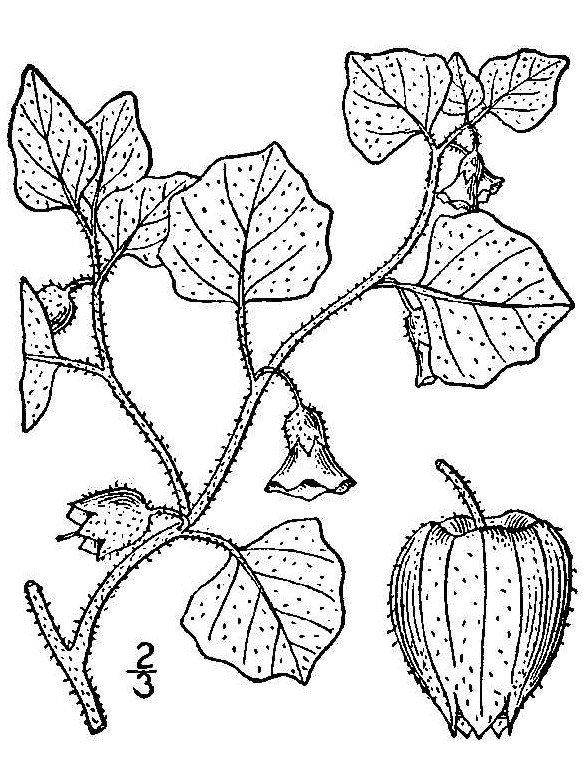

Scientific classification
- Kingdom: Plantae
- Clade: Tracheophytes
- Clade: Angiosperms
- Clade: Eudicots
- Clade: Asterids
- Order: Solanales
- Family: Solanaceae
- Genus: Physalis
- Species: P. hederifolia

Binomial name
- Physalis hederifolia A.Gray

= Physalis hederifolia =

Species of fruit and plant

Physalis hederifolia is a species of flowering plant in the nightshade family known by the common name ivyleaf groundcherry. It is native to the southwestern United States and northern Mexico, where it can be found in rocky, dry desert and mountain habitat. This is a rhizomatous perennial herb producing a hairy, branching stem 10 to 80 centimeters long. The gray-green oval leaves are 2 to 4 centimeters long and have smooth or bluntly toothed edges. The flowers growing from the leaf axils are bell-shaped and just over a centimeter long. They are yellow with five brown smudges in the throats. The five-lobed calyx of sepals at the base of the flower enlarges as the fruit develops, becoming an inflated, veined nearly spherical structure 2 or 3 centimeters long which contains the berry.

There are several wild varieties of this species.

== Etymology ==
In the binomial name, hederifolia originates from the Latin words meaning "ivy leaved".

== Uses ==
The Zuni people boil the fruit of the fendleri variety in small quantities of water, crush it and use it as a condiment.
