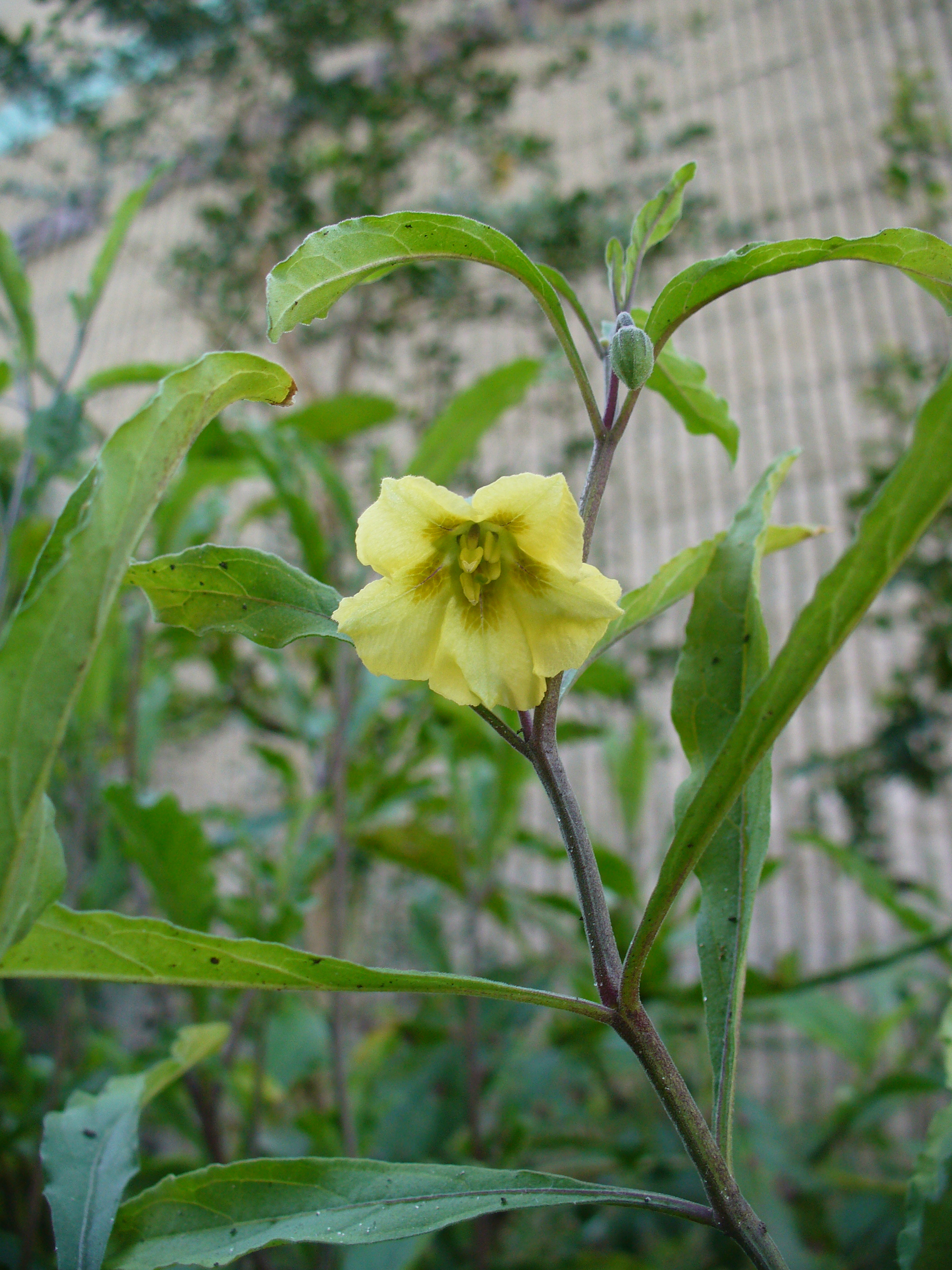

Scientific classification
- Kingdom: Plantae
- Clade: Tracheophytes
- Clade: Angiosperms
- Clade: Eudicots
- Clade: Asterids
- Order: Solanales
- Family: Solanaceae
- Genus: Physalis
- Species: P. walteri

Binomial name
- Physalis walteri Nutt.

Synonyms
- Physalis ellotii Physalis maritima

= Physalis walteri =

Species of flowering plant

Physalis walteri, commonly known as Walter's groundcherry or dune groundcherry, is a species of flowering plant. Its native distribution is Alabama, Florida, Georgia and Virginia in the United States as well as Northeast Mexico. Its habitat is pinelands and open coastal areas.

It is a perennial herb that grows to a height of around 2 feet with yellow flowers that bloom from May to September. It grows from deep and stout roots with stems that are a mix of erect and ground spreading densely covered with very small hairs. The leaves are 3 to 13 cm long and 1.5 to 5 cm wide.

It is named after Thomas Walter a botanist born in Britain who moved to Charleston, South Carolina in the 18th century.
