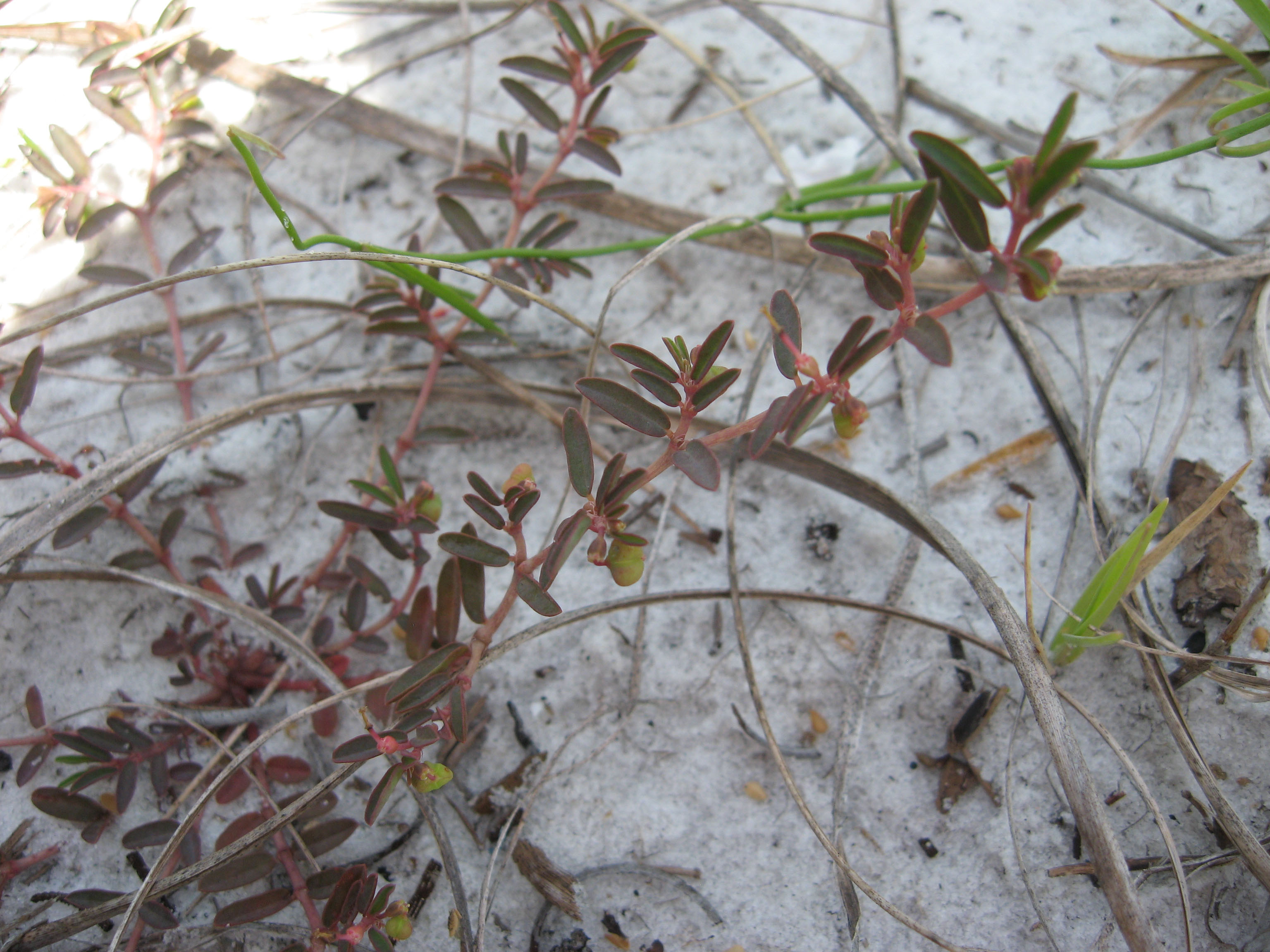

Scientific classification
- Kingdom: Plantae
- Clade: Embryophytes
- Clade: Tracheophytes
- Clade: Spermatophytes
- Clade: Angiosperms
- Clade: Eudicots
- Clade: Rosids
- Order: Malpighiales
- Family: Euphorbiaceae
- Genus: Euphorbia
- Species: E. bombensis

Binomial name
- Euphorbia bombensis Jacquin

= Euphorbia bombensis =

Species of flowering plant

Euphorbia bombensis, commonly called the southern seaside spurge, is a species of flowering plant in the spurge family. It is found in warm coastal areas of North America, South America and the islands of the Caribbean. In the Southeastern United States, its natural habitat is the open sands of dunes, preferring areas with little competition in areas behind the foredune.
