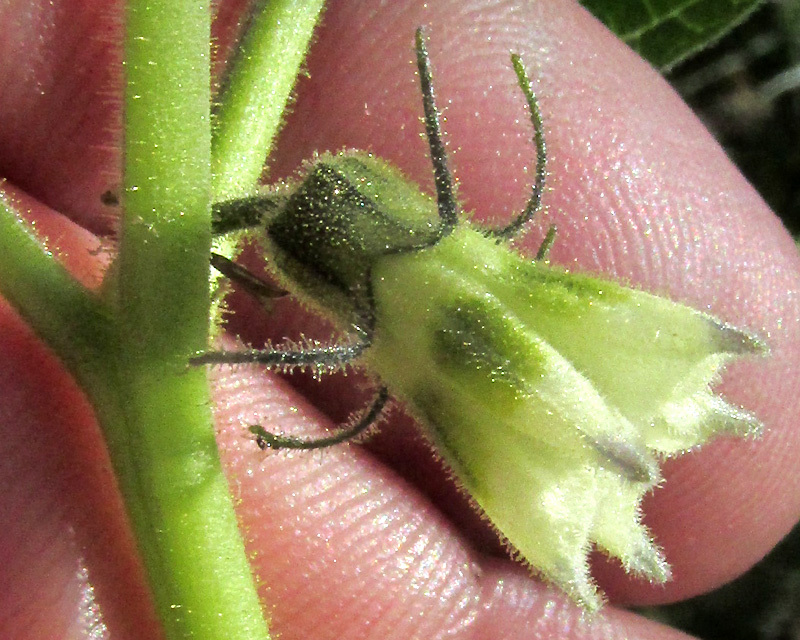
- Physalis nicandroides flower from side

Scientific classification
- Kingdom: Plantae
- Clade: Tracheophytes
- Clade: Angiosperms
- Clade: Eudicots
- Clade: Asterids
- Order: Solanales
- Family: Solanaceae
- Genus: Physalis
- Species: P. nicandroides

Binomial name
- Physalis nicandroides Schltdl., 1846

= Physalis nicandroides =

Species of flowering plant

Physalis nicandroides, one of numerous species generally referred to as husk tomatoes, ground tomatoes, or tomatillos, is a species of flowering plant belonging to the family Solanaceae.

== Description ==
Physalis nicandroides is an erect, branched, annual, herbaceous plant standing up to 1 m (3 ft 3 in) tall. It bears hairs, some of which are glandular, lending the plant a musky odor. Its leaf blades are broadly egg-shaped to heart-shaped, up to 18.4 cm (7.2 in) long and 16 cm (6.3 in) wide. Leaf tips are pointed, and the two sides of blade bases may be unlike and often don't meet. Margins are variously toothed to smooth.

Single flowers arise from stems on somewhat descending peduncles up to 8 mm (0.31 in) long. Bell-shaped corollas up to 6 mm (0.24 in) wide are creamy whitish with five conspicuous greenish spots at their throats. Pollen-producing anthers rising from the throat are strikingly blue to blue-green. When the corolla falls off leaving the developing fruits, the peduncles thicken and elongate up to 1.4 cm (0.55 in). As the flower's ovary grows and matures, the calyx enlarges and inflates to completely enclose the resulting berry-type fruit suggesting a Chinese lantern. The fruiting calyx is strongly 5-angled, up to 2.6 cm (1.0 in) wide, and turns golden brown and leathery after drying. The berry inside it is dark brown, up to 1.5 cm (0.59 in) in diameter, and contains numerous seeds.

== Distribution ==
The iNaturalist map registering observations of Physalis nicandroides indicates that the species occurs in most of Mexico south through Central America into most of Costa Rica. It has been introduced into Paraguay.

== Habitat ==
In Mexico, Physalis nicandroides is a common weed along roads or near crop fields, at elevations of 120-2000m (~400-6500 feet). In the state of Guerrero it is reported also as occurring in moist ravines.

== Human uses ==
=== As food ===
Combined with other ingredients like onion, garlic, cilantro and chili pepper, Physalis nicandroides fruits are used for making salsas. However, Physalis nicandroides fruits contain tannins which taste a little bitter and that keeps some people from using them, though others like it.

=== As medicine ===
In Mexico, gargling a decoction from boiling the root of Physalis nicandroides is used for the pain caused by infected molars. In the state of Guerrero, Physalis nicandroides is used to reduce symptoms of edemas. In Puebla the leaves are used against conjunctivitis. In the states of Morelos and Guerrero, mothers who have just given birth are bathed in water prepared from the species.

Studies indicate that a certain steroid from Physalis nicandroides inhibits HIV transcription, thus might help in the treatment of HIV/AIDS.

=== For trapping small insects ===
In the Mexican state of Guerrero, the sticky leaves of Physalis nicandroides, because of their sticky, gland-bearing hairs, are strewn on the floor, or even woven into palm-leaf-based floor mats called petates, to immobilize tiny insect pests, particularly fleas. In fact, in Mexico Physalis nicandroides often is called matapulgas, meaning "flea killer".

=== Ceremonial ===
In southern Mexico, dry Physalis nicandroides plants have been observed used as part of Christmas decorations.

== Phytochemistry ==
In species of Physalis the most frequently occurring chemical constituents are naturally occurring steroids known as withanolides. These occur as secondary metabolites. In Physalis nicandroides, other constituents reported are sucrose esters and labdane diterpenoid.

== Phylogeny ==
Genetic analysis employing Bayesian inference and maximum likelihood grouped Physalis nicandroides with P. peruviana, P. longifolia, P. glutinosa and P. caudella, all in the Withaninae, one of three subtribes which were recognized.

== Etymology ==
The genus name Physalis is a New Latin modification of the Late Greek physallis, from meaning "bladder, bubble", in reference to the inflated calyx surrounding the mature fruit.

In the species name nicandroides, the nicandr- refers to the genus Nicandra, closely related to Physalis species. The -oides is a word-forming element from Latinized Ancient Greek meaning "like, like that of": thus "like Nicandra."

== Gallery ==
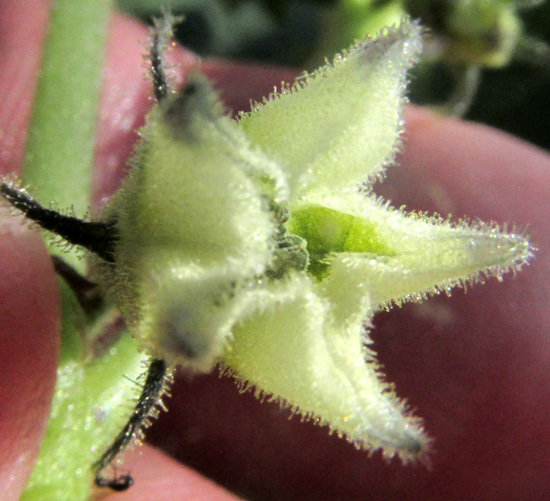
Physalis nicandroides, partly open flower with densely hairy corolla

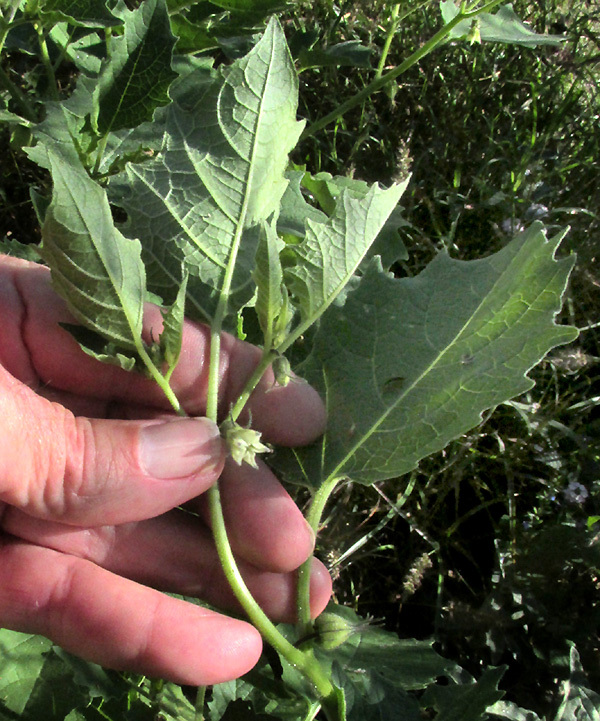
Physalis nicandroides, leafy, flowering stem

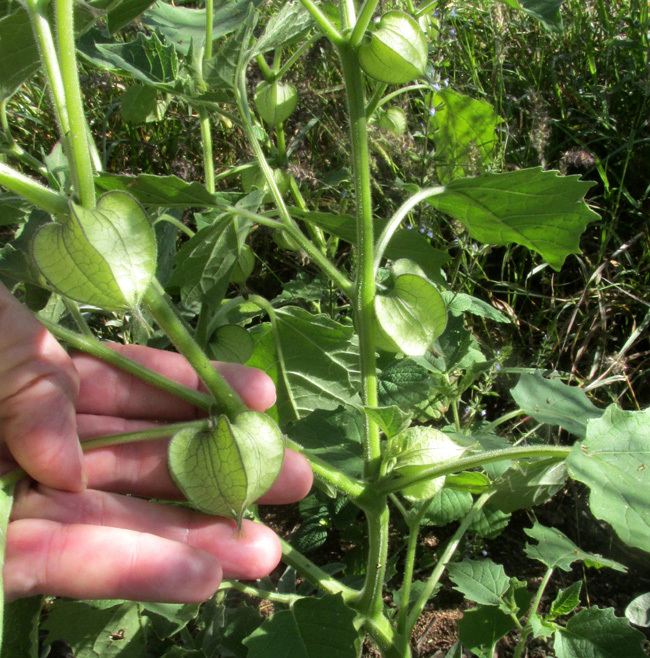
Physalis nicandroides, nearly mature inflated calyxes with fruit developing inside

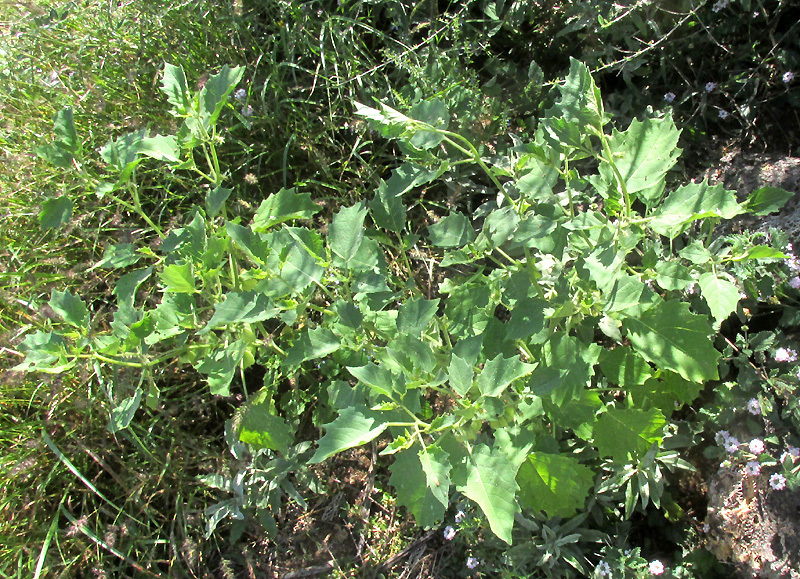
Physalis nicandroides, plant in weedy habitat
