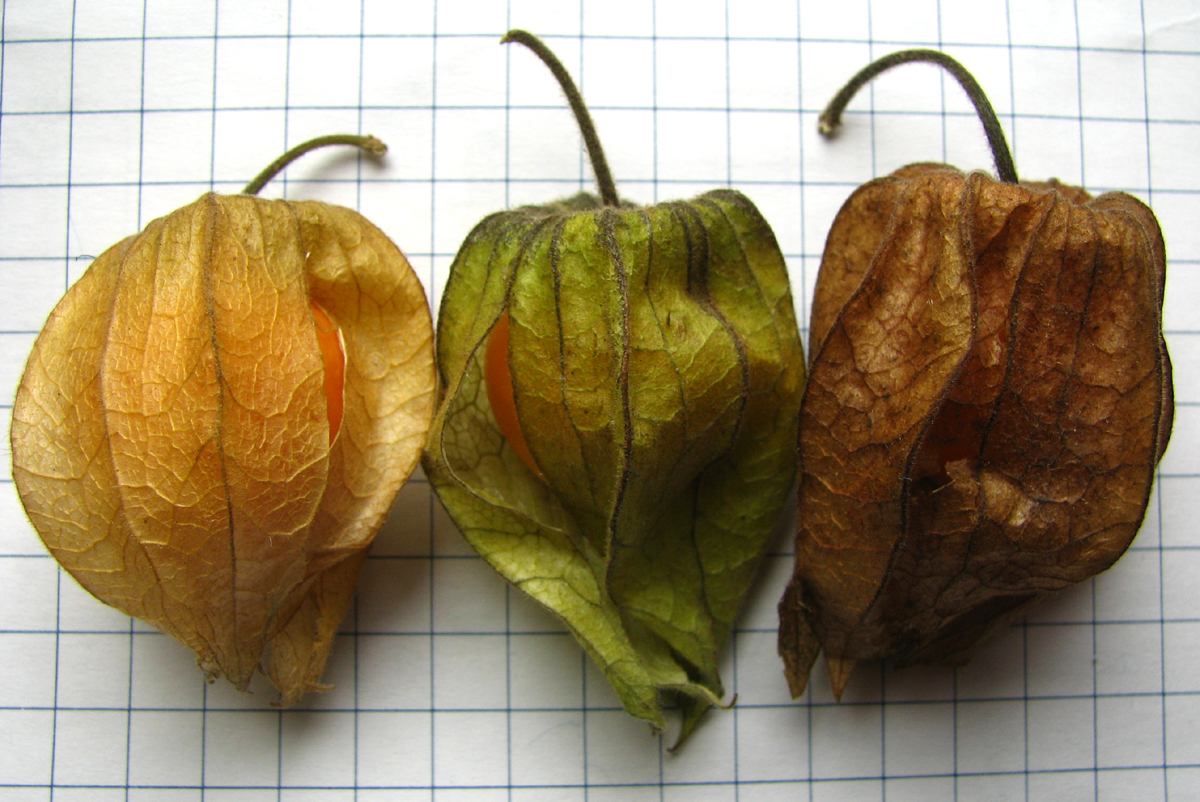

Scientific classification
- Kingdom: Plantae
- Clade: Embryophytes
- Clade: Tracheophytes
- Clade: Spermatophytes
- Clade: Angiosperms
- Clade: Eudicots
- Clade: Asterids
- Order: Solanales
- Family: Solanaceae
- Genus: Physalis
- Species: P. heterophylla

Binomial name
- Physalis heterophylla Nees

= Physalis heterophylla =

Clammy groundcherry

Species of plant

Physalis heterophylla, colloquial name clammy groundcherry, is species of herbaceous plant in the family Solanaceae. It is native to North America, occurring primarily in the eastern United States and Canada. It is known to occur in all contiguous states except for Nevada and California. It is found mainly in habitats such as dry or mesic prairies, gravel hills and rises, sandy or rocky soils, and waste places such as roadsides.

== Identification ==
Physalis heterophylla is a perennial, and is one of the taller-growing North American members of the genus, reaching a height up to 50 cm. The leaves are alternate, with petioles up to 1.5 cm, ovate in shape, usually cordate at the base (this is especially true of mature leaves), 6–11 cm long at maturity. Each member of the genus Physalis has at least one characteristic that makes it easy to differentiate in the field. For P. heterophylla, the stems and leaves are glandularly pubescent, giving it the "clammy" feel from which its name is derived. The plant also has distinctive thick rhizomes that run horizontal to the stem. Some sources recognize four distinct subspecies based primarily on leaf variation:

- P. heterophylla var. heterophylla, with thin leaves that have dentate margins;
- P. heterophylla var. clavipes, with thick, conspicuously veined leaves and sparingly tooth-like protrusions on otherwise entire margins;
- P. heterophylla var. ambigua, with thick, conspicuously veined leaves and dentate margins;
- P. heterophylla var. nycangienea, with thin leaves that have sparingly tooth-like protrusions on otherwise entire margins.

The flowers are on simple inflorescences that emerge from leaf apexes. The petals are yellow on the exterior, and yellow on the interior with purple highlights emanating up each petal from the base. They are funnelform in shape, with five fused petals. There are five reticulated sepals, which enlarge after flowering to eventually protect the maturing fruit. Stamens five, with yellow anthers and purple filaments. The flowers face downwards when open, and are about 2.5 cm in diameter. The fruits are typical for the family (appearing like a tomatillo), and have a slightly bitter taste, though they are perfectly edible when ripe.

== Toxicity ==
Outside of the mature fruit, which is edible, all parts of P. heterophylla contain toxic amounts of solanine, which is poisonous to humans and animals. Symptoms of solanine poisoning include headache, stomach pain, lowered temperature, dilated pupils, vomiting, diarrhea, circulatory and respiratory depression, and loss of sensation.

== Gallery ==
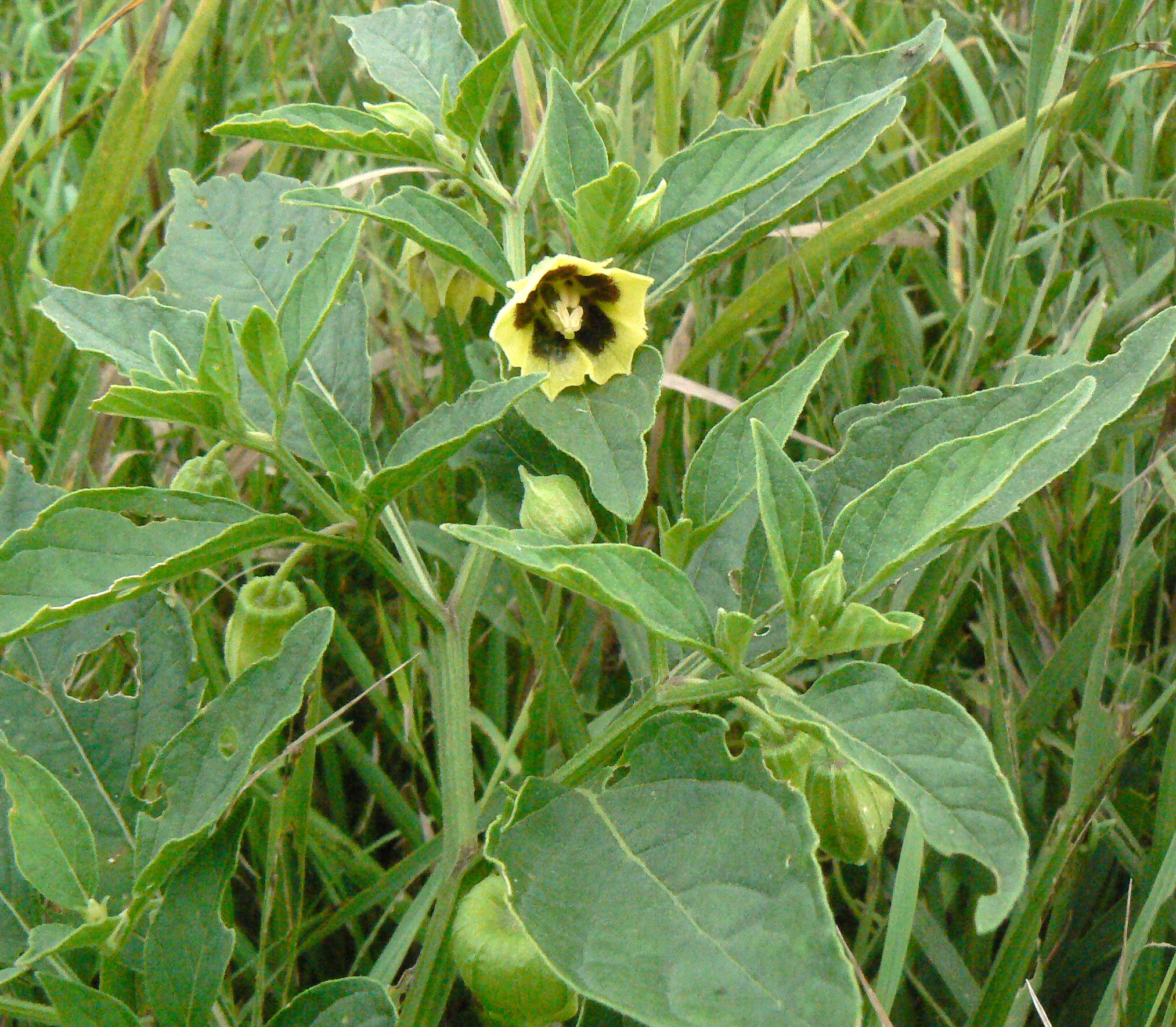
Detail of flower and leaves

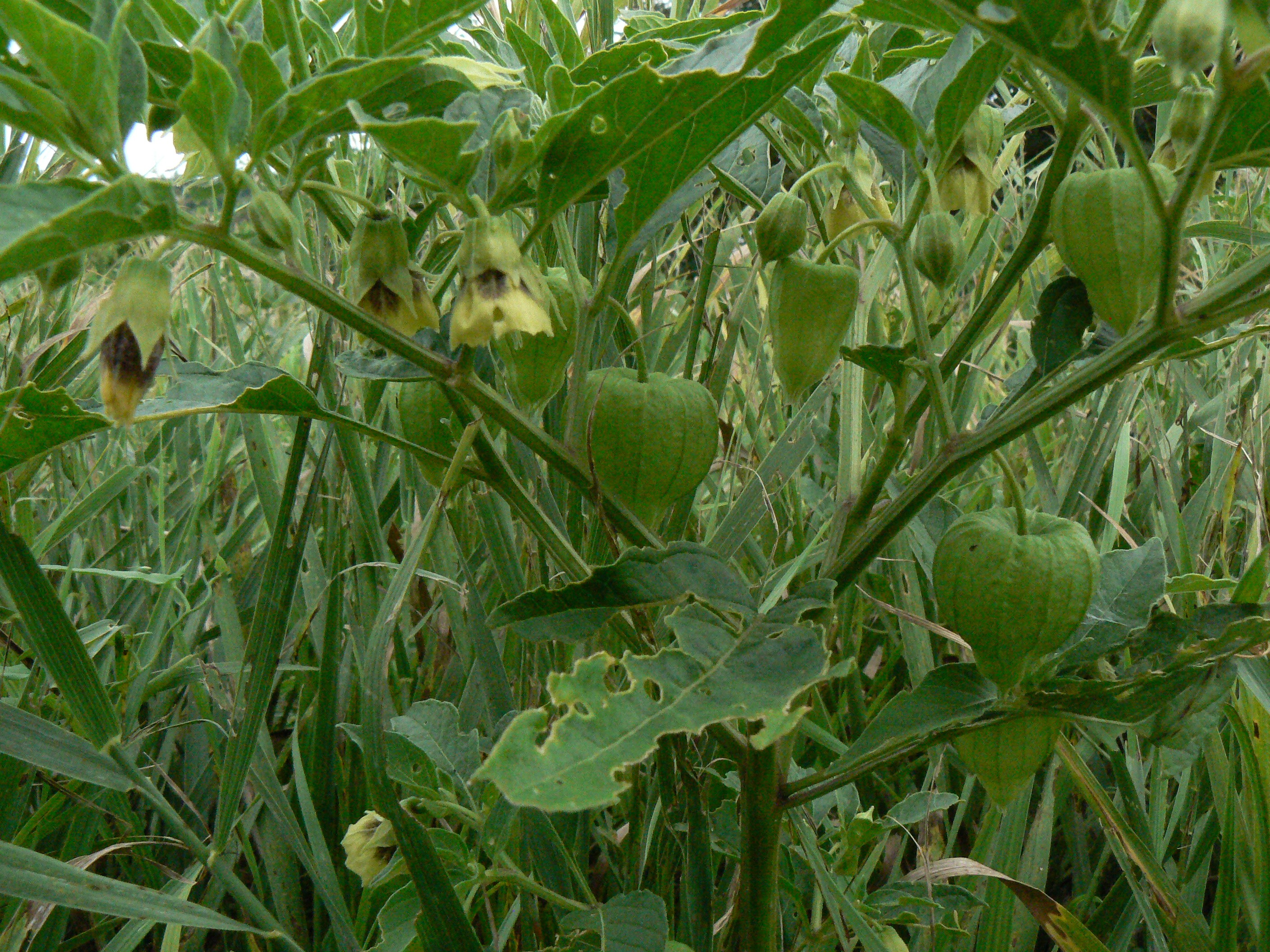
Detail of fruit
