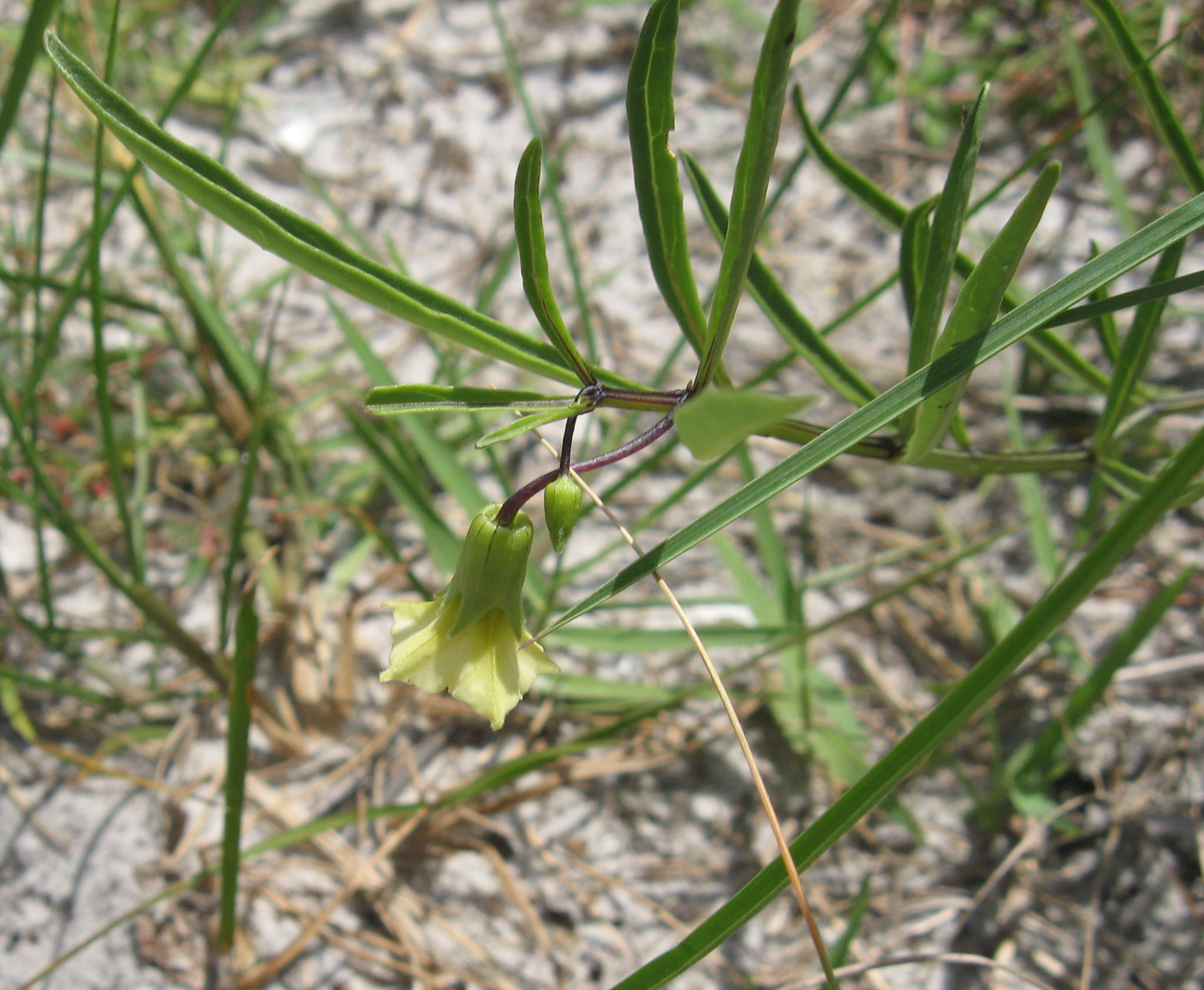

Scientific classification
- Kingdom: Plantae
- Clade: Tracheophytes
- Clade: Angiosperms
- Clade: Eudicots
- Clade: Asterids
- Order: Solanales
- Family: Solanaceae
- Genus: Physalis
- Species: P. angustifolia

Binomial name
- Physalis angustifolia Nutt.

= Physalis angustifolia =

Species of flowering plant

Physalis angustifolia, the coastal groundcherry, is a species of flowering plant in the family Solanaceae. It is native to the Gulf Coast shoreline of the Southeastern United States, where it is found on maritime dunes and sands.
