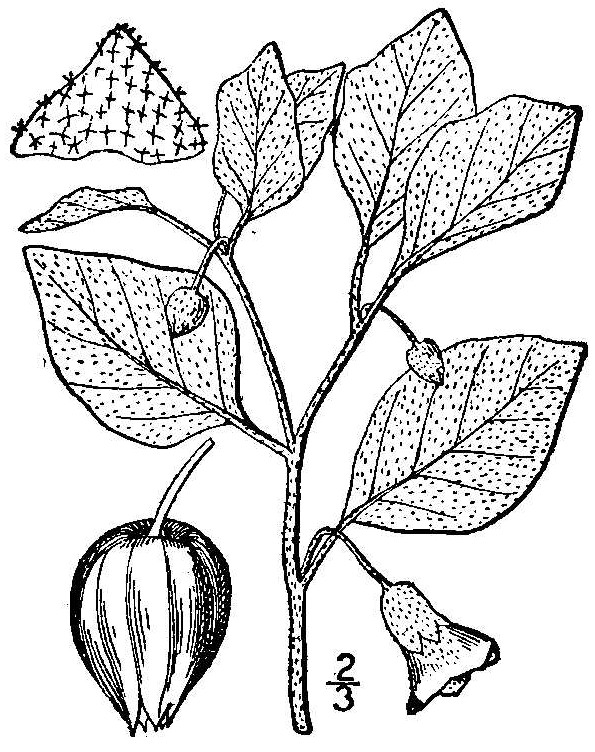

Scientific classification
- Kingdom: Plantae
- Clade: Tracheophytes
- Clade: Angiosperms
- Clade: Eudicots
- Clade: Asterids
- Order: Solanales
- Family: Solanaceae
- Genus: Physalis
- Species: P. viscosa

Binomial name
- Physalis viscosa L.

= Physalis viscosa =

Species of flowering plant

Physalis viscosa is a species of flowering plant in the nightshade family known by many common names, including starhair groundcherry, stellate ground-cherry and grape groundcherry in English, and arrebenta-cavalo, balãozinho, and camambú in Portuguese and Spanish (from Guaraní akamambu, «blister»). It is native to South America, and it is known on other continents as an introduced species and sometimes a weed. It can grow in many types of habitat, including disturbed areas.

This is a rhizomatous perennial herb producing hairy stem up to about 40 centimeters in maximum height. The oval leaves are 3 to 5 centimeters long and have smooth or toothed edges. The flowers blooming from the leaf axils are bell-shaped and about 1.5 centimeters wide. They are yellow with darker centers, and have five stamens tipped with yellow anthers. The calyx of sepals at the base of the flower enlarges as the fruit develops, becoming an inflated, ribbed, lanternlike structure 2 to 3 centimeters long which contains the berry.

== Uses ==
The nutritional and medicinal use of P. viscosa has been documented in widespread areas of Bolivia, eastern Paraguay. and northern Argentina. Its use is particularly common in the Gran Chaco region where the Toba-Pilagá, Nivaclé, and the Maká eat the ripe fruits raw, while the Lengua-Maskoy bake the fruits in embers or boil them before eating. Members of the Lengua-Maskoy group also use a liquid prepared from crushed leaves placed in water to treat conjunctivitis and other eye ailments by dropping the liquid preparation into the affected eye.

Migrants to the region including Anglican missionaries from England and Mennonite settlers fleeing persecution make cooked and baked dishes from Physalis viscosa. In the Mennonite Plautdietsch dialect of Gran Chaco they are known as Junitjoasche (literally June cherries) and are used to in jams, compotes, and pies, notably Riebelplautz, a "Sunday pie" similar to crumble.
