= Darcyanthus =

Scientific classification
- Kingdom: Plantae
- Clade: Tracheophytes
- Clade: Angiosperms
- Clade: Eudicots
- Clade: Asterids
- Order: Solanales
- Family: Solanaceae
- Genus: Darcyanthus; Hunz. ex N.A.Harriman

Synonyms
- Brachistus spruceanus (Hunz.) D'Arcy; Chamaesaracha spruceana (Hunz.) Hunz.; Darcya spruceana (Hunz.) Hunz.; Physalis spruceana Hunz.

Genus of flowering plants

Darcyanthus is a monotypic genus of flowering plants belonging to the family Solanaceae. The single known species is Darcyanthus spruceanus (Hunz.) Hunz. ex N.A.Harriman

Its native range is Peru, Brazil and Bolivia.

The genus name of Darcyanthus is a combination of names; 'Darcy' in honour of William Gerald D'Arcy (1931–1999), Canadian-born American botanist at the Missouri Botanical Garden, and 'anthus' from the Greek ánthos meaning "flower". The Latin specific epithet of spruceanus honors botanist Richard Spruce. It was first described and published in Novon Vol.21 on page 47 in 2011.
