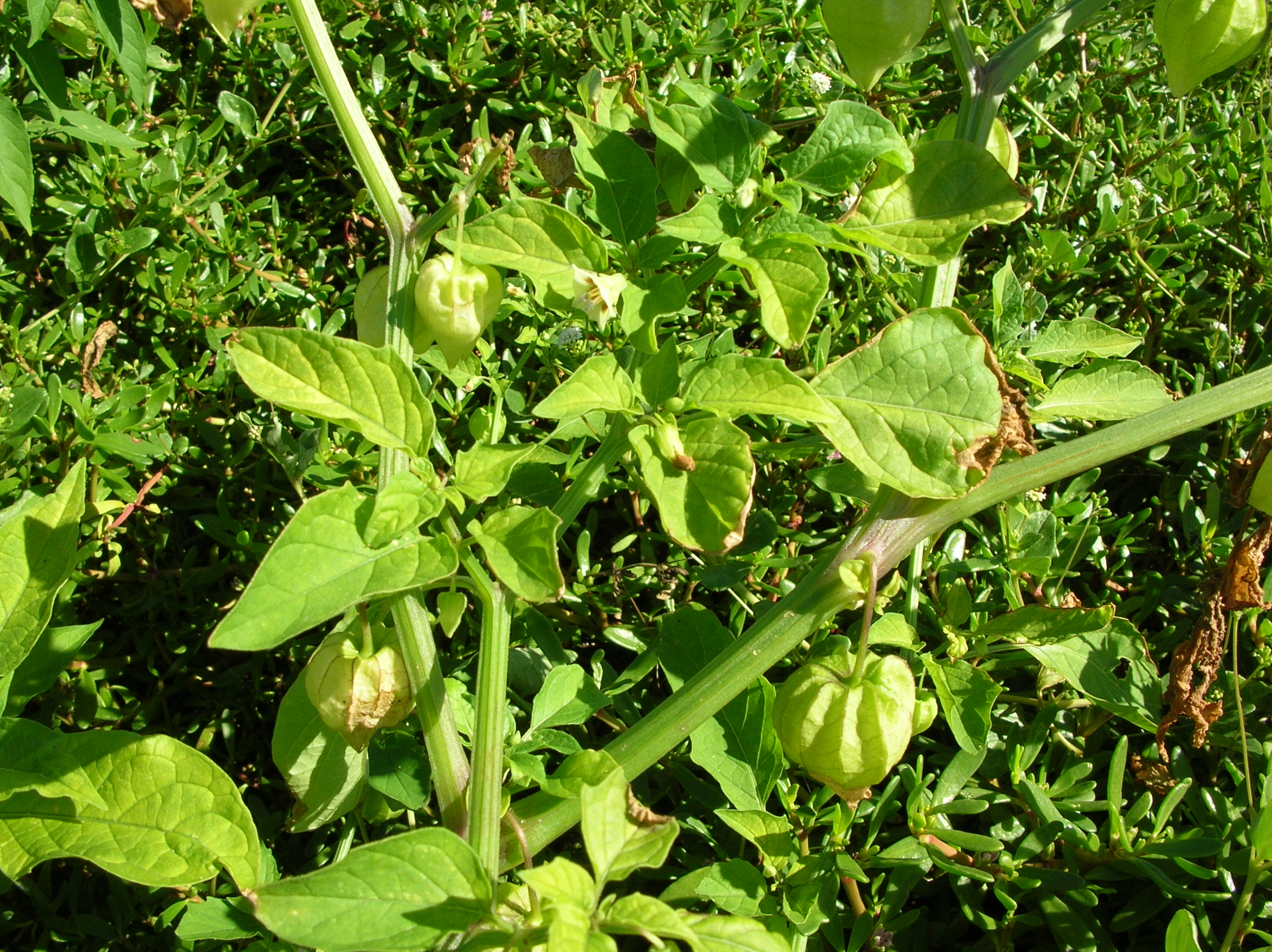
- Cutleaf groundcherry

Scientific classification
- Kingdom: Plantae
- Clade: Tracheophytes
- Clade: Angiosperms
- Clade: Eudicots
- Clade: Asterids
- Order: Solanales
- Family: Solanaceae
- Genus: Physalis
- Species: P. angulata

Binomial name
- Physalis angulata L.

Synonyms
- List: Boberella angulata (L.) E.H.L.Krause; Physalis abyssinica Nees; Physalis angulata var. capsicifolia (Dunal) Griseb.; Physalis angulata var. dubia Kuntze; Physalis angulata var. lanceifolia (Nees) Waterf.; Physalis angulata f. linkiana (Nees) Stehlé; Physalis angulata var. linkiana (Nees) A.Gray; Physalis angulata var. normalis Kuntze; Physalis angulata var. pendula (Rydb.) Waterf.; Physalis angulata f. ramosissima (Mill.) Stehlé; Physalis angulata var. ramosissima (Mill.) O.E.Schulz; Physalis angulata f. tenuis Hassl.; Physalis angulata var. villosa Bonati; Physalis arenaria Nees; Physalis bodinieri H.Lév. & Vaniot; Physalis capsicifolia Dunal; Physalis ciliata Siebold & Zucc.; Physalis cuneata Rusby; Physalis dubia Link; Physalis esquirolii H.Lév. & Vaniot; Physalis fauriei H.Lév. & Vaniot; Physalis glaberrima Colla; Physalis hermannii Dunal; Physalis ixocarpa Nees; Physalis lanceifolia Nees; Physalis linkiana Nees; Physalis linkiana var. arenaria Dunal; Physalis linkiana var. venosa Dunal; Physalis margaranthoides Rusby; Physalis micrantha Link; Physalis minima L.; Physalis parviflora R.Br.; Physalis pendula Rydb.; Physalis ramosissima Mill.; Physalis repens Nakai; Physalis surinamensis Miq.; Saracha angulata M.Martens & Galeotti

= Physalis angulata =

Species of flowering plant

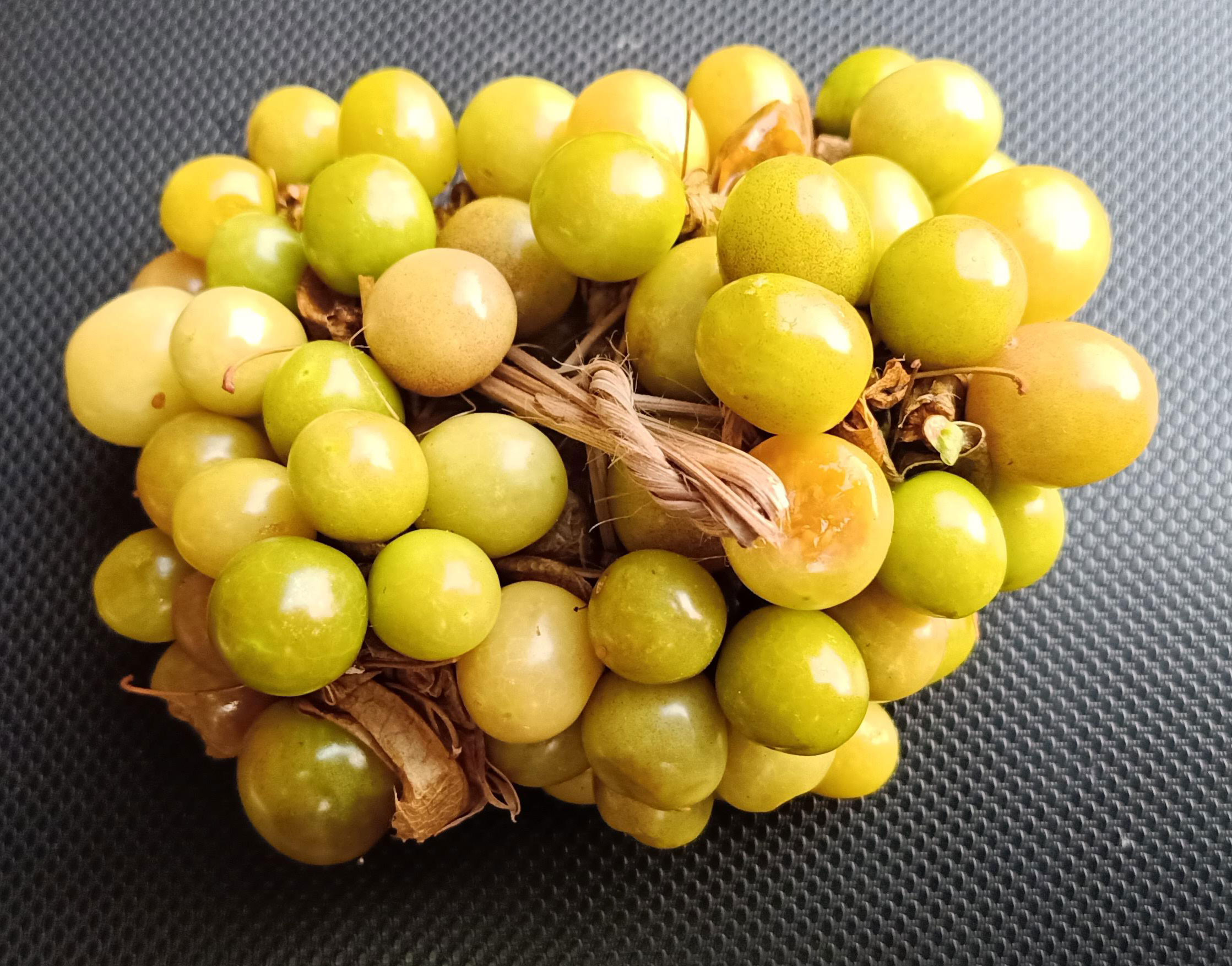
Fruits of Physalis angulata.

Physalis angulata is an erect herbaceous annual plant belonging to the nightshade family Solanaceae. Its leaves are dark green and roughly ovate, often with serrate margins. The flowers are five-sided and pale yellow; the yellow-orange fruits are borne inside a balloon-like calyx. The exact native range is uncertain. The species may be naturally endemic to Australia or the Americas or the native range may encompass both the Americas and Australia. It is now widely distributed and naturalized in tropical and subtropical regions worldwide.

The plant produces edible fruit that can be eaten raw, cooked, jammed, etc. However, all other parts of the plant are poisonous. Members of the Toba-Pilagá ethnic group of Gran Chaco traditionally eat the ripe fruits raw. Unripe raw fruits, flowers, leaves, and stems of the plant contain solanine and solanidine alkaloids that may cause poisoning if ingested by humans, cattle, or horses.

== Vernacular names ==
Language	Common names
English	angular winter cherry, balloon cherry, cutleaf groundcherry, gooseberry, hogweed, wild tomato, camapu, and others
Spanish	bolsa mullaca
Malayalam	njottanjodiyan, mottaampuli
Indonesian	ceplukan, ciplukan
Sundanese	cecendet
Suriname	batoto wiwiri
Meru	Nkabakabu
Egyptian Arabic	Hrankash
Yoruba	Koropo
Guarani	Kamambu
Cebuano	tinotino
