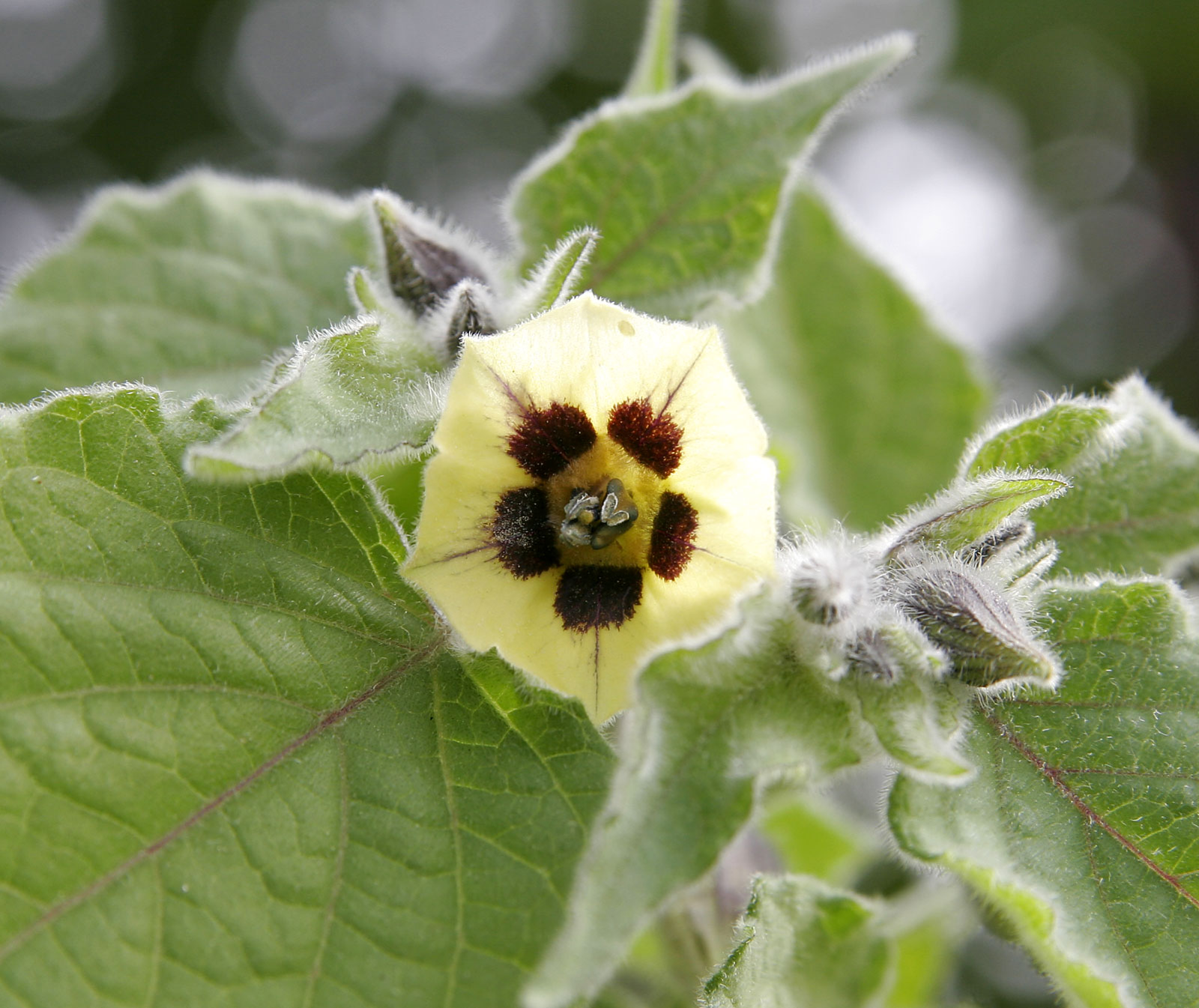

Scientific classification
- Kingdom: Plantae
- Clade: Tracheophytes
- Clade: Angiosperms
- Clade: Eudicots
- Clade: Asterids
- Order: Solanales
- Family: Solanaceae
- Genus: Physalis
- Species: P. pubescens

Binomial name
- Physalis pubescens L.

Synonyms
- List: Alicabon barbadense (Jacq.) Raf.; Alkekengi procumbens Moench; Alkekengi villosa Moench; Boberella pubescens (L.) E.H.L.Krause; Physalis angustiloba Waterf.; Physalis barbadensis Jacq.; Physalis barbadensis var. obscura (Michx.) Rydb.; Physalis brasiliensis Sendtn.; Physalis decumbens Dunal; Physalis floridana Rydb.; Physalis foetens Poir.; Physalis foetidissima Lag.; Physalis heterophylla Colla; Physalis heterophylla var. timbo Dunal; Physalis hirsuta Dunal; Physalis hirsuta var. barbadensis (Jacq.) Dunal; Physalis hylophila Standl.; Physalis latiphysa Waterf.; Physalis miraflorensis Dunal; Physalis nodosa Lam.; Physalis obscura Michx.; Physalis obscura var. pubescens Pursh; Physalis petiolaris Rusby; Physalis pubescens var. hygrophila (Mart.) Dunal; Physalis pubescens var. minutifolia O.E.Schulz; Physalis ramosa Mill.; Physalis rothiana Nees; Physalis staminea Muhl. ex Nees; Physalis subulata Rydb.; Physalis surinamensis Miq.; Physalis turbinata Medik.; Physalis villosa Mill.; Physalis viscosa Elliott

= Physalis pubescens =

Species of fruit and plant

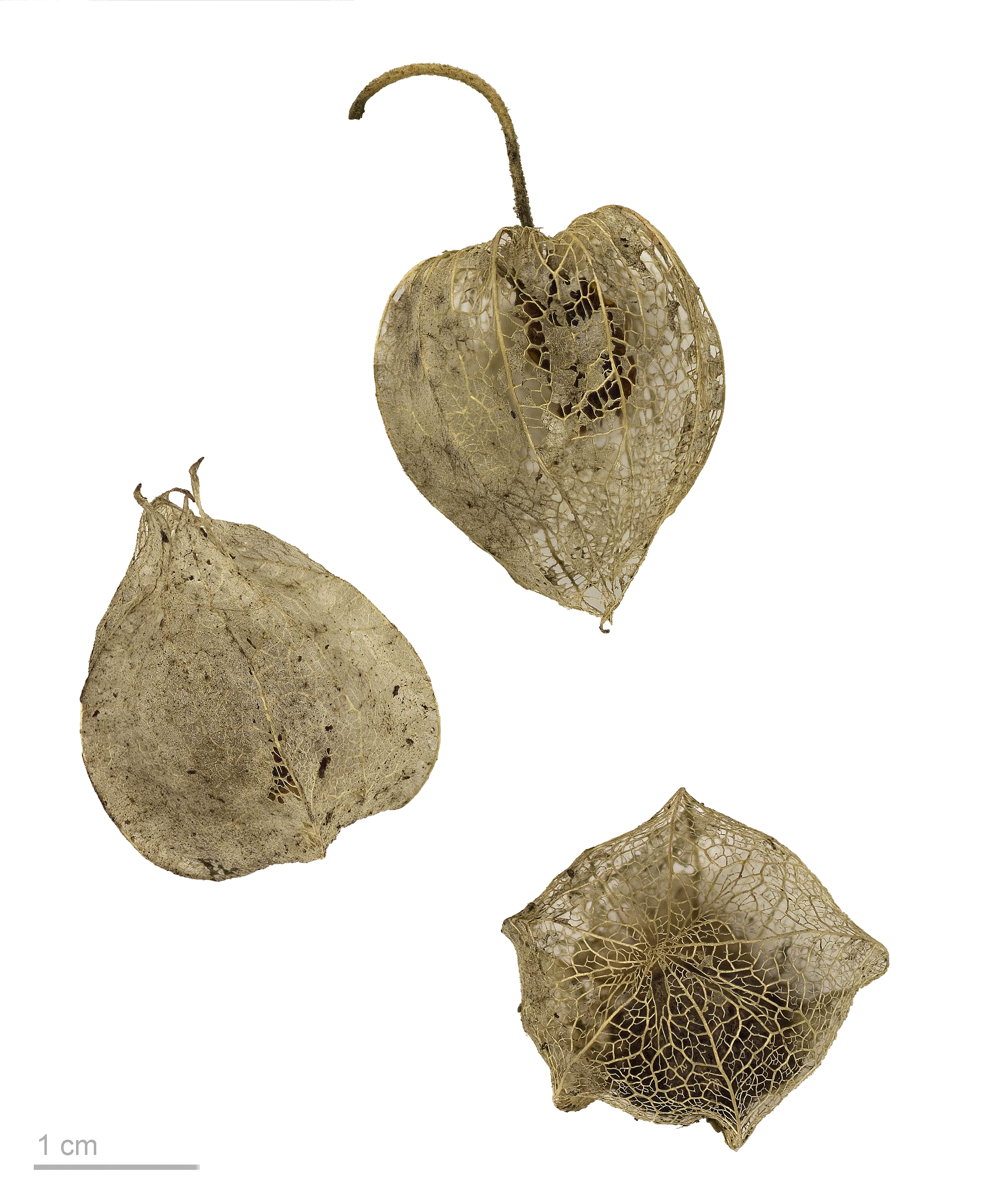
Physalis pubescens – MHNT

Physalis pubescens is a species of flowering plant in the nightshade family known by many common names, including husk tomato, low ground-cherry and hairy groundcherry in English, and muyaca and capulí in Spanish. It is native from Brazil, but also found in southern half of the United States, Mexico, Central and much of South America. It can be found elsewhere as an introduced species and sometimes a weed. It can grow in many types of habitat, including disturbed areas. This is an annual herb producing a glandular, densely hairy stem up to about 60 cm (24 in) in maximum height from a taproot. The oval or heart-shaped leaves are 3–9 cm (1.2–3.5 in) long and have smooth or toothed edges. The flowers blooming from the leaf axils are bell-shaped and about a centimeter long. They are yellow with five dark spots in the throats, and have five stamens tipped with blue anthers. The five-lobed calyx of sepals at the base of the flower enlarges as the fruit develops, becoming an inflated, ribbed, lanternlike structure 2–4 cm (0.79–1.57 in) long which contains the berry.

== Cultivation and use ==
The fruits can be harvested and ripened for a few weeks to be made into pie or jelly; unripe fruits and green parts of the plant are somewhat poisonous.

Members of the Toba-Pilagá culture of Gran Chaco consume the fruit raw. Toba-Pilagá children burst the fruits of Physalis pubescens var. hygrophila (Mart.) Dunal (a synonym of Physalis pubescens) when they are covered by the inflated calyx by placing it on the palm of the hand and striking it with the other hand in order to make noises as part of games.
