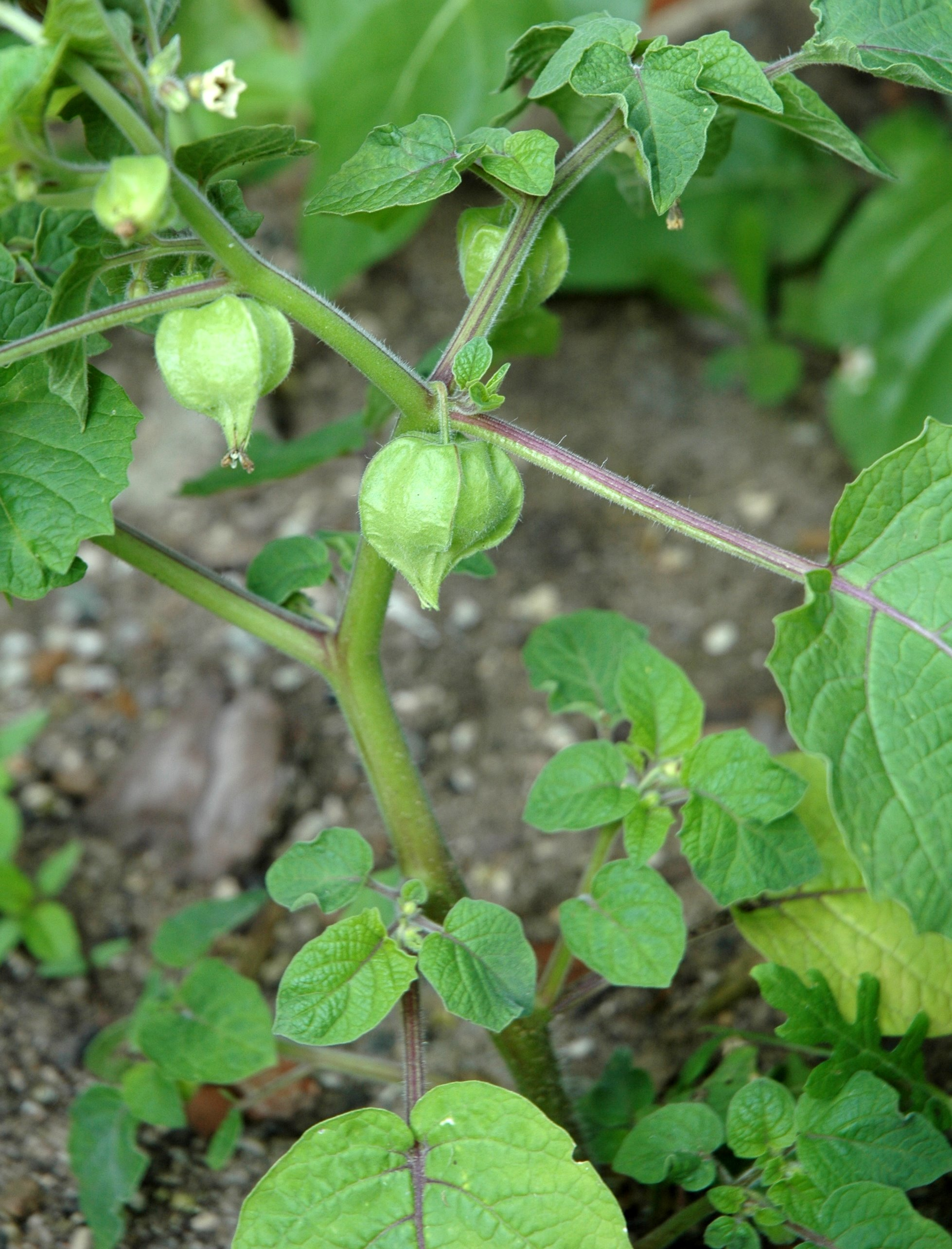

Scientific classification
- Kingdom: Plantae
- Clade: Tracheophytes
- Clade: Angiosperms
- Clade: Eudicots
- Clade: Asterids
- Order: Solanales
- Family: Solanaceae
- Genus: Physalis
- Species: P. pruinosa

Binomial name
- Physalis pruinosa L.

= Physalis pruinosa =

Species of flowering plant

Physalis pruinosa is a plant in the genus Physalis in the nightshade family Solanaceae, often referred to as ground cherry or husk tomato. It is a native species in a range extending from northern Mexico through Central America. The plant has a low, spreading habit, and fruits develop in a papery husk, as is characteristic of the genus. While most parts of the plant are toxic to humans due to the presence of solanine and solanidine, the fruit becomes edible (and sweet) once it has ripened to yellow. (The papery husk, a calyx, remains toxic and should not be eaten.) The fruit's flavor is similar in some respects to that of a ripe tomatillo, but notably has a strong flavor of pineapple as well, a fact reflected in the name of a common commercial variety, "Cossack Pineapple". The ripe fruit of Physalis pruinosa var. argentina J. M. Toledo & Barboza is a food source for the Pilagá ethnic group.

It is currently the subject of research into the possibility of developing a genetically modified variety for industrialized agriculture. The research involves CRISPR genome editing which may be able to accelerate the domestication process.
