= Roast pig =

Roast pig refers to a number of dishes featuring pig that is roasted.

Examples include:

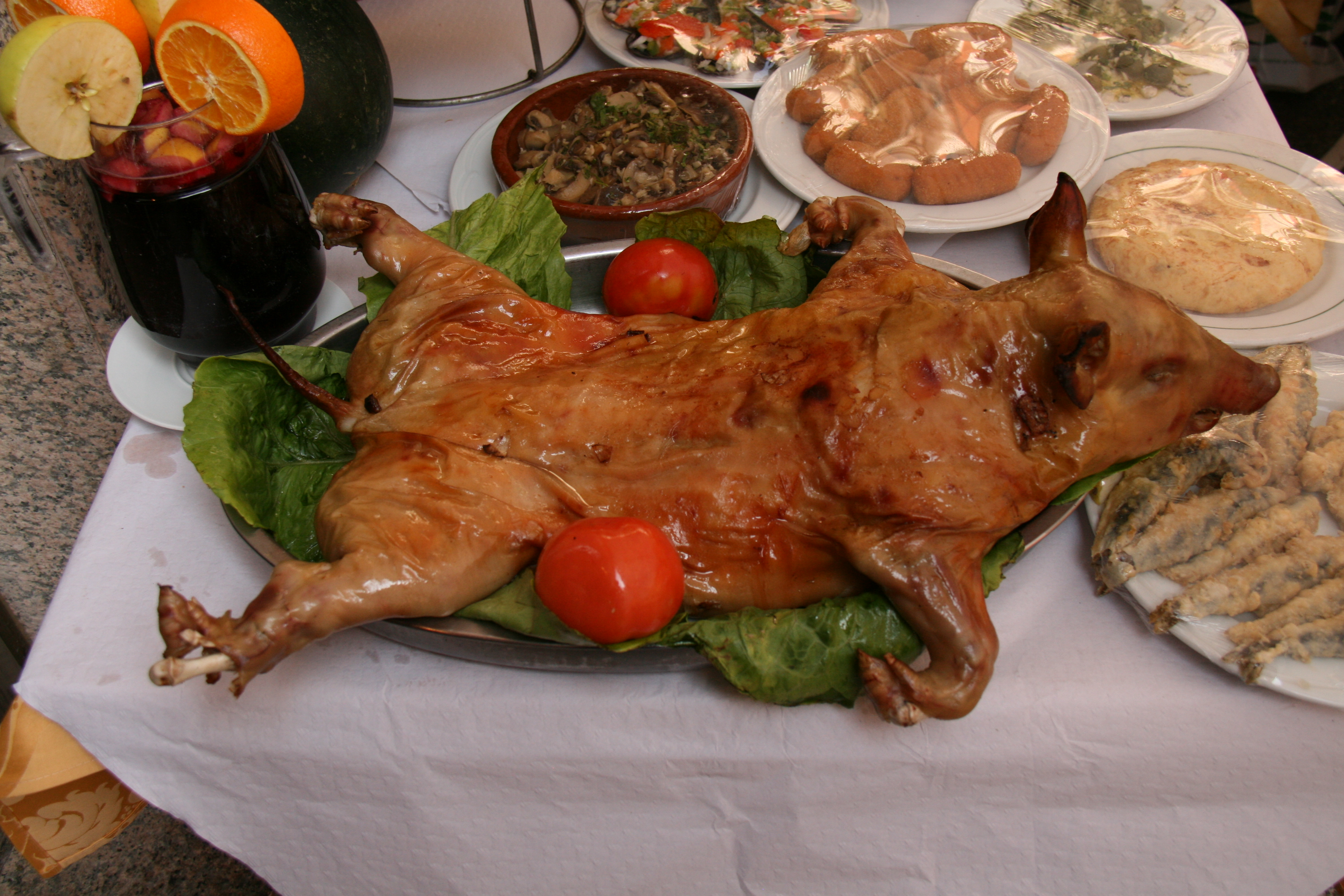
Cochinillo asado.

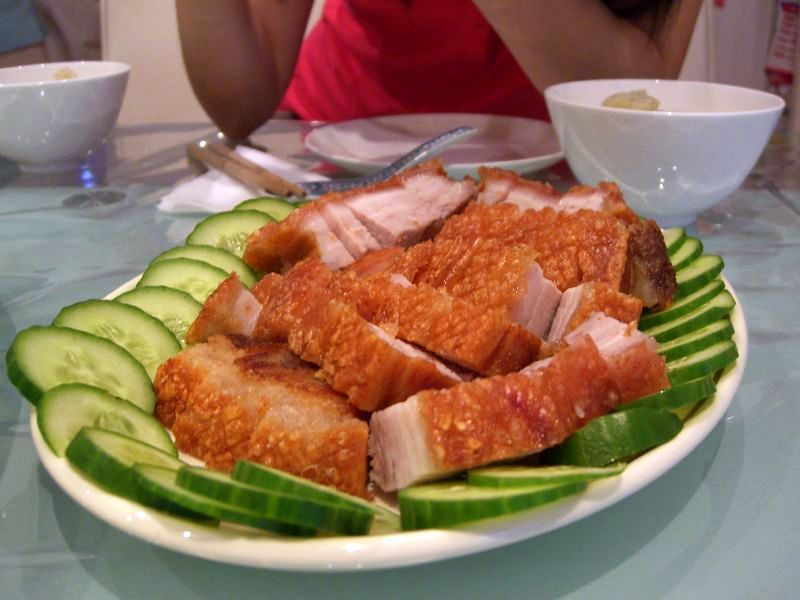
Siu yuk.

- Babi panggang, in Indonesian cuisine
- Cochinillo asado (also called Tostón asado), in Spanish cuisine
- Hornado, in Ecuadorian cuisine
- Pig roast, whole roasted pig in various cuisines

- Filipino lechon, or inihaw na baboy, in Filipino cuisine

- Siu yuk, in Cantonese (Chinese) cuisine
- Suckling pig, roast suckling pig

- Lechón, roast suckling pig in Spanish cuisine and former Spanish colonies
