= Mu krop =

Thai-Chinese Crispy Pork

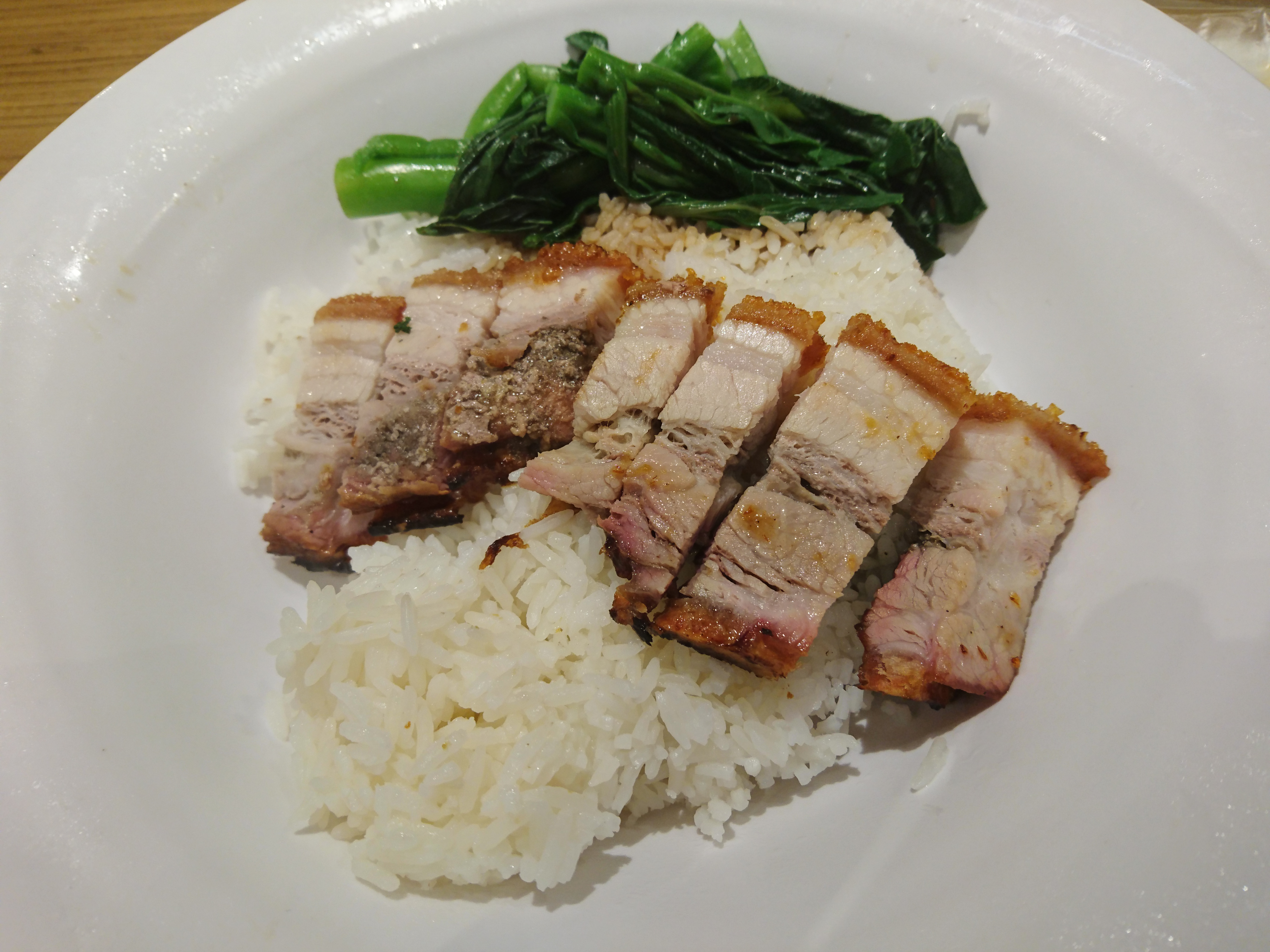
Khao mu krop (crispy pork rice)

Mu krop (Thai: หมูกรอบ, romanized: mǔu-grɔ̀ɔp, lit. 'crispy pork') or crispy pork belly, is a Thai version of siu yuk, a dish made of pork belly that has been through the process of intense bristles removal by scraping and washing thoroughly before being cooked. Sometimes it are boiled and then cut into size before adding seasonings, such as salt, soy sauce, sugar, garlic, pepper and other seasoning or herbs like red onion, lemongrass, kaffir lime leaves, and left to be marinated. Then, the marinated pork belly is fried until the rinds are golden and crispy. Further cooking can be done in the oven, but it is optional. Mu krop is then served in pieces without any bristles, and some burnings are acceptable. The energy from 100 grams of mu krop (7–10 pieces) provides approximately 385–420 calories and 30 grams of fat, according to the Thai Nutrition Bureau, Department of Health, Ministry of Public Health. Additionally, when crispy pork is on rice, the energy received will increase to 550–600 calories and more when it is stir-fried with oil. An example of stir-fried dishes with mu krop would be Thai's famous family of stir-fried called phat kaphrao – a main-course dish that incorporates holy basil, or kaphrao (กะเพรา), for its fragrance, spice, and peppery flavor. Other than phat kaphrao, mu krop can be stir-fried with curry paste, chili and ginger, added to dishes like kuay jab, or simply be enjoyed on plain rice.

== History ==
Mu krop is a dish that originated in Guangdong in southern China and Hong Kong during the late Qing dynasty. Chinese citizens from these provinces migrated to settle in many areas of Southeast Asia, and crispy pork, a local signature dish, has therefore spread overseas from the Chinese communities to the new societies, including Thailand.

The Cantonese-style crispy pork that was first brought into Thailand and is still served in Chinese restaurants. The original siu yuk is cooked using the method of marinating five-spice powder before grilling large pieces of pork belly over high heat for several hours until the pork is cooked throughout. This maintains a thick layer of fat and keeps the rind crispy with a faint scent of spices.

When mu krop was introduced to Thailand during the Ayutthaya period, the cooking method developed slightly differently and the pork belly was baked until it was dry and crispy on the outside and soft on the inside. In this era, crispy pork was considered an interesting menu item and became very popular in the Thai food market. In the present day, crispy pork continues to gain high popularity. This is a result of the delicious characteristic of shiny golden brown, crispy and crunchy rinds with layers of soft, tender and juicy fat and chewy meat, and the aroma from the mixed seasonings. The crispiness comes from the large amount of porosity and complete dryness on the pork belly's surface along with the consistently high heat temperature, which helps air penetrate the skin layer better. However, unlike the Cantonese-style crispy pork, mu krop lacks the spice powder in the original recipe. This evolved as Thai restaurants cooked the meat again in hot frying oil for made-to-order restaurants, rendering the prior seasonings useless.

== Notable restaurants ==
Kuay Jab Mr. Joe, a recipient of the Bib Gourmand award, is one of the oldest shops known for its mu krop and has been open for over 50 years. The shop's founder was an immigrant from mainland China and the shop has been passed down to the current third generation. The restaurant serves Kuay Jab, a clear soup that is thick with pepper, with the crispiness of the pork belly along with soft and sticky noodles and concentrated soup.

Ah Yat Abalone is fine dining restaurant noted for its Cantonese-style crispy pork located near Central World. This restaurant is a branch of Forum, a 2-Michelin-starred restaurant in Hong Kong. Customers often order crispy pork to eat with dim sum and the restaurant's famous abalone menu.

== Mu krop in other countries ==
=== China ===
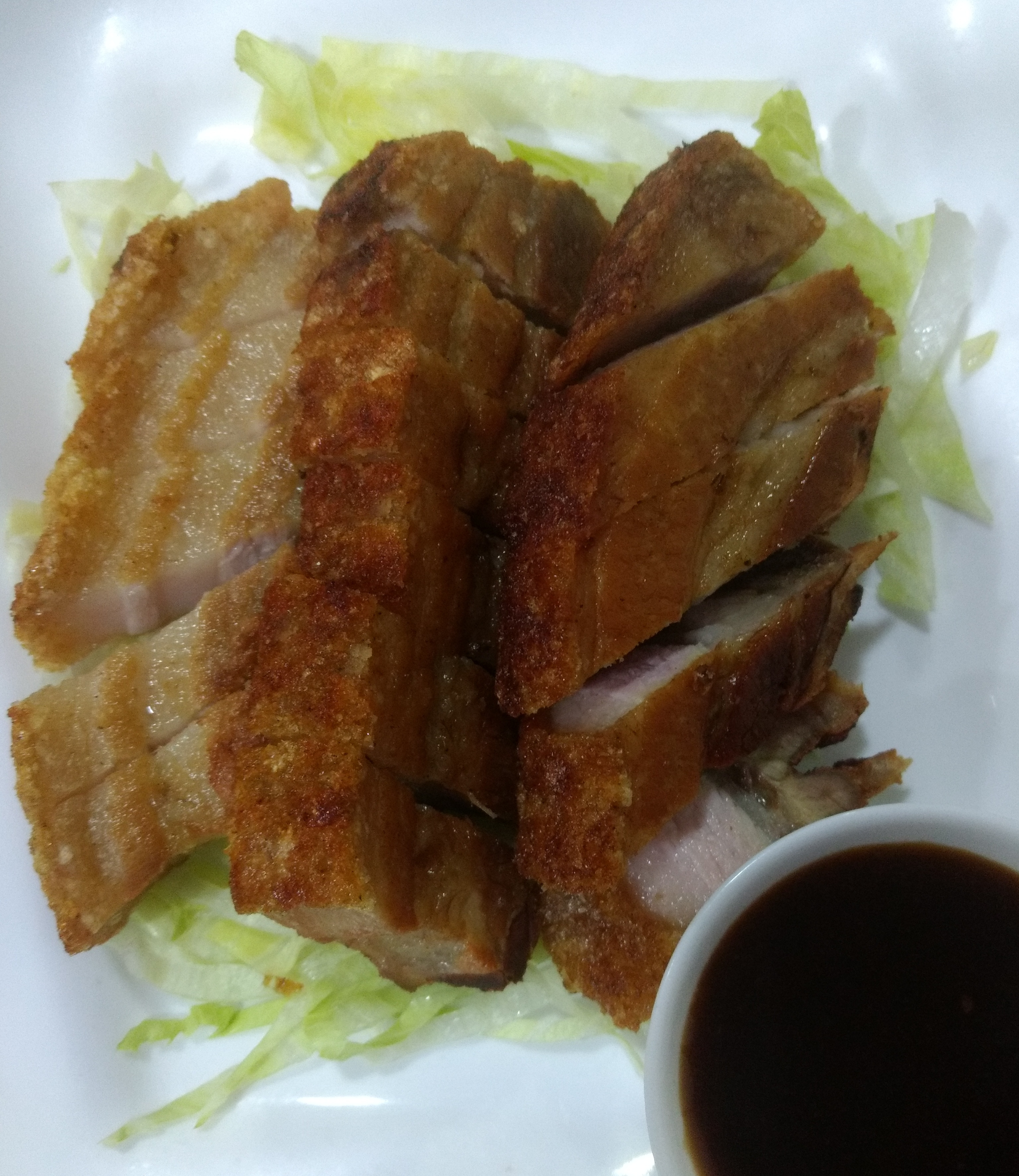
Siu yuk

In China, crispy pork is called siu yuk. It originates from Guangzhou uses pork belly or whole pork marinated in salt and vinegar. It is served with soy sauce or sweet and salty hoisin sauce and popularly eaten during celebrations.

=== Philippines ===
The Philippines has lechon kawali, a crispy pork dish with a special Filipino sauce called lechon sauce, made from chicken liver or ground pork liver, simmered and seasoned with vinegar. and spices, sweet, sour, oily and spicy flavors. It is served as an appetizer or as a main course with rice.

=== Vietnam ===
Vietnam has mu krop that is called thit heo quay. Streaky pork grill with crispy skin is famous in Vietnam. Thit heo quay is the main dish at parties and weddings. Lush pork with crispy and salty skin from fermenting with salt and soy sauce for eight hours is the standard. Also favor adding some red food coloring to make the pork have a pinkish color before grill or roast. Serve as one dish with salad, rice, or vermicelli. Mostly is Cantonese recipe so it has alternative name as siu yuk.

=== Singapore ===
Mu krop in Singapore is called sio bak. Streaky pork or ribs pork grill until the skin is crispy. Influenced by China. The main recipe is pork soaked in salt and grilled. A popular recipe is num yu sio bak, which is pork marinated in saline then marinated in fermented bean curd for 3–4 hours on the pork area except the skin. Then grill or roast until it is soft and has crispy skin. It has salty taste with a smell of fermented bean curd.
