= Pig pickin' =

Whole hog barbecue

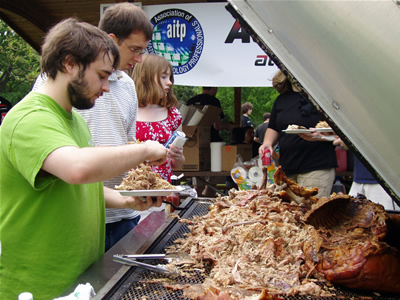

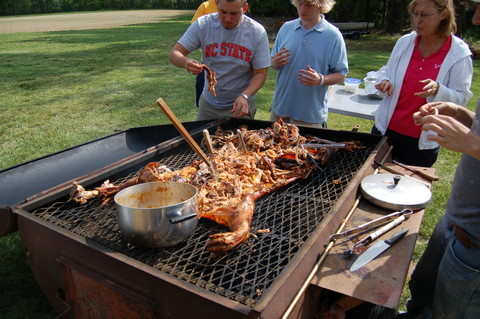

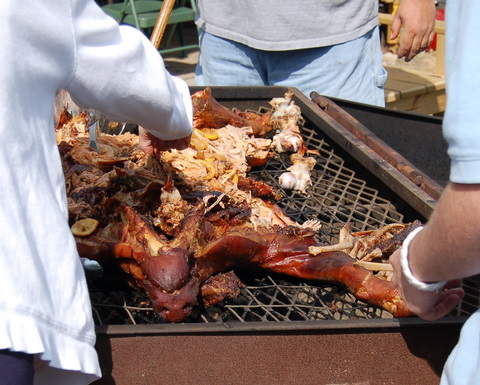

A pig pickin' (also known as rolling a pig, pig pull, hog roast, pig roast or, among the Cajun, "cochon de lait") is a type of party or gathering held primarily in the American South which involves the barbecuing of a whole hog (the castrated male pig or barrow, bred for consumption at about 12 weeks old). Females, or gilts, are used as well. Boars (full-grown intact males) and sows generally are too large.

Many Southern families have a pig roast for Thanksgiving or Christmas, graduations, weddings, or summer gatherings. Some communities hold cook-offs during festivals, where cooks compete against one another for prize money.

== Cooking ==
A pig, often around 80–120 pounds dressed weight, is split in half and spread onto a large charcoal or propane grill. Some practitioners use a separate stove filled with hardwood to produce coals which are then transferred under the charcoal grill by shovel; others use charcoal with chunks of either blackjack oak, hickory wood or some other hardwood added for flavor. The style of these grills are as varied as the methods of producing them, some being homemade while others are custom-made.

There is a long-running debate among barbecue enthusiasts over the merits of different fuels. Propane is said to maintain a consistent temperature, whereas charcoal or charwood are often touted as producing better-tasting meat.

The cooking process is communal and usually directed by an authority figure; the host is helped by friends or family. It usually takes four to eight hours to cook the pig completely; the pig is often started "meat-side" down, and then is flipped one time once the hog has stopped dripping rendered fat. Some practitioners clean ashes from the skin with paper towels or a small whisk broom before flipping the hog to help produce high quality cracklings from the skin.

Often the hog is basted while cooking, though the method and sauce used differs according to region. For instance, a typical South Carolina Piedmont-area baste would be a mustard based sauce, an Eastern North Carolina baste is usually a very light vinegar based sauce with red pepper flakes, and Western North Carolina barbecue uses sauce with a ketchup base similar to traditional barbecue sauce.

When the cooking is complete, the meat should ideally be tender to the point of falling off of the bone. The meat is then either chopped or pulled into traditional Carolina-style pork barbecue, or it is picked off the hog itself by the guests. It is from the latter that the gathering gains its name. The barbecue is sometimes eaten with hushpuppies (fried cornmeal, occasionally flavored with onions and/or sweet corn), coleslaw, baked beans, or sometimes Brunswick stew. In South Carolina, it is common to serve pilaf or hash as a side dish. Hash is a blend of leftover pork mixed with barbecue sauce and usually served over rice.

Sweet tea, beer, and soft drinks are often served.

== Culture ==
The pig pickin' is a significant part of the culture of the South; the necessary work and time needed to cook the hog makes it ideal for church gatherings ("dinner on the grounds") or family reunions, and they can be held virtually year-round thanks to the region's mild winters. Pig pickin's are popular among the most devoted tailgaters at college football games across the South. East Carolina University in Greenville North Carolina, famous for its football tailgating, has been holding an annual pig pickin' contest called the Pigskin Pig-Out since 1985. The pig pickin' has been long associated with politics; many local political parties and politicians still use the pig pickin' to attract people to meetings and campaign rallies. In 1983, Rufus Edmisten, running for Governor of North Carolina at the time, was overheard saying "I've eaten enough barbecue. I am not going to eat any more. I'm taking my stand and that is it."

Culturally and culinarily different from traditional Deep South pig pickin' events, pig roasts are a common occurrence in Cuba and the Philippines, as well as the non-mainland American state of Hawaii, with roasts being done in the traditions of those places.

== See also ==
- Cooking
- Culinary arts
- Lechon
- Pulled pork
- Bull roast
- Whole hog barbecue
