= Pig roast =

Mealtime event roasting a whole pig

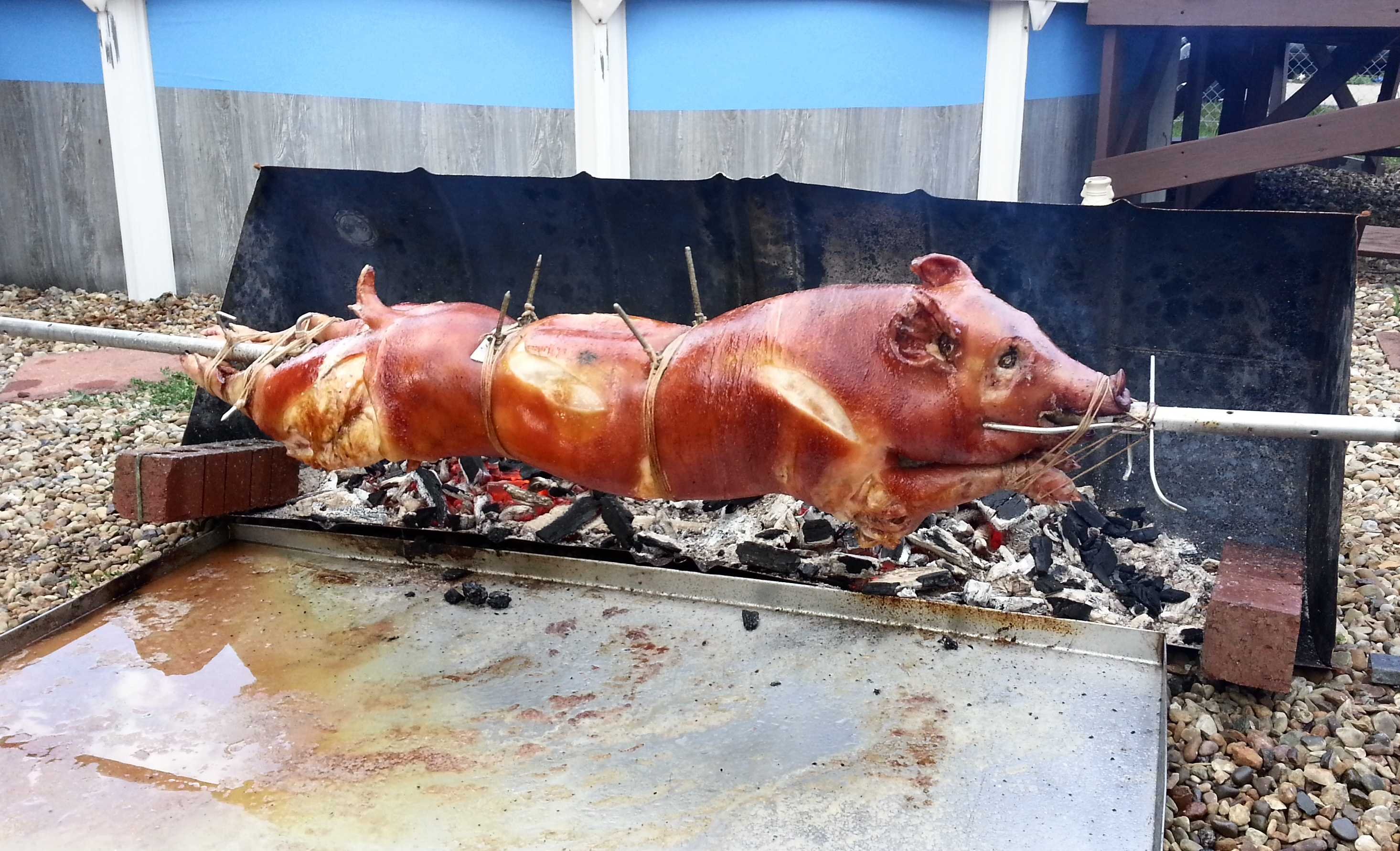
A pig roasting on a rotating spit in the United States. Note hot coals off to the side and a drip pan underneath. It is basted with a mixture of salt and beer

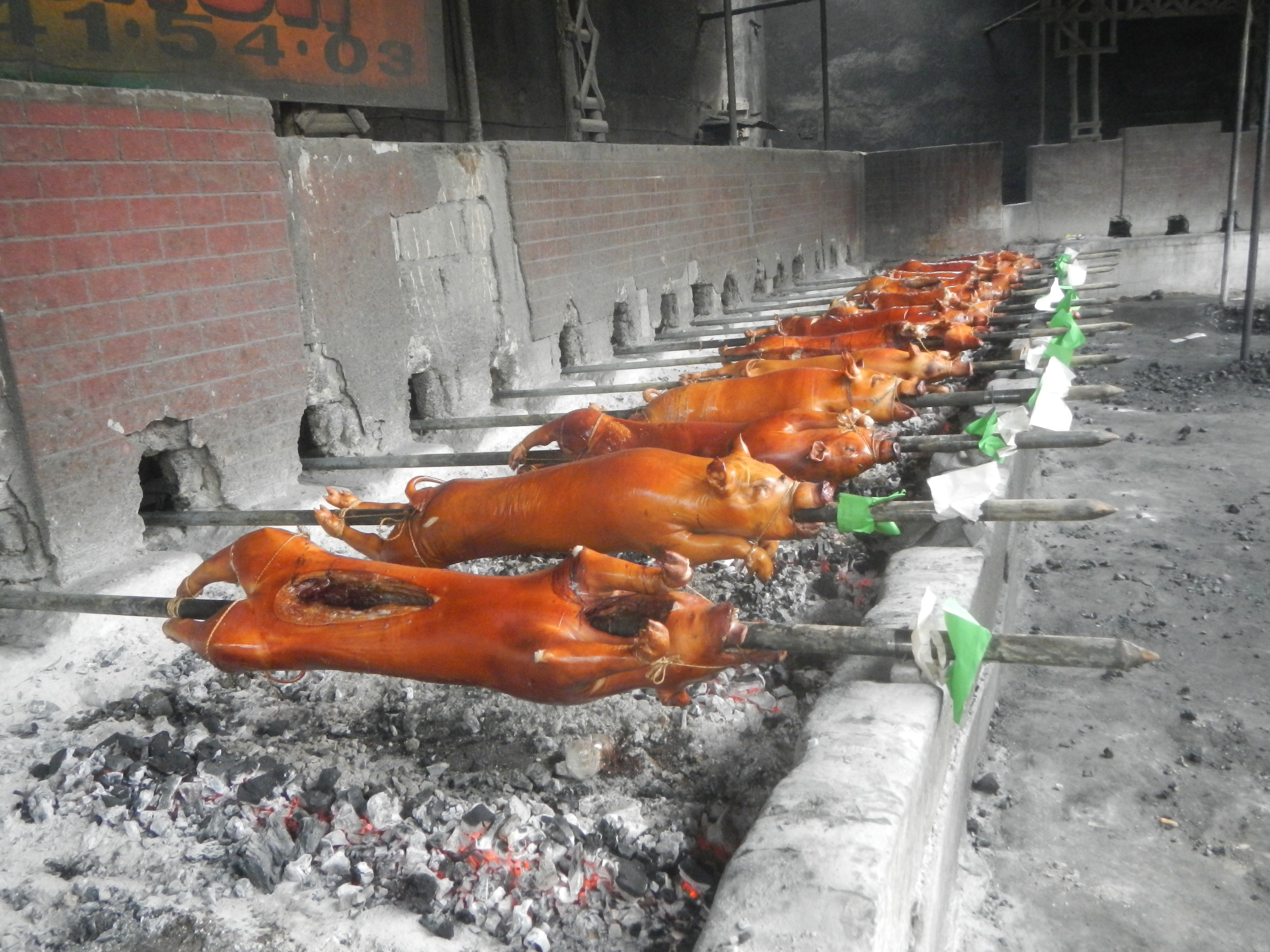
Filipino lechón being roasted in one of the lechón stores in La Loma, Quezon City, Philippines

A pig roast or a hog roast is an event or gathering which involves the barbecuing of a whole pig. Pig roasts, under a variety of names, are a common traditional celebration event in many places including the United Kingdom, Philippines, Puerto Rico and Cuba. It is also popular in the United States, especially in the state of Hawaii (a luau) and in the Southern United States (whole hog barbecue and pig pickin'). In Southeast Asia, a pig roast is a staple among the Buddhist, and Christian communities, notably among Catholic Filipinos and Hindu Balinese people, or Buddhist Chinese people.

== Traditions ==
The tradition of the hog roast goes back millennia and is found in many cultures. There are numerous ways to roast pork, including open fire rotisserie style roasting, and "caja china" style box grilling. Many families traditionally have a pig roast for Thanksgiving or Christmas. In Miami and other areas with large Cuban, Puerto Rican, Honduran or other Caribbean populations pig roasts are often held on Christmas Eve by families and friends, whereas families from Hawaii often hold a roast on Memorial Day.

=== Indonesia ===
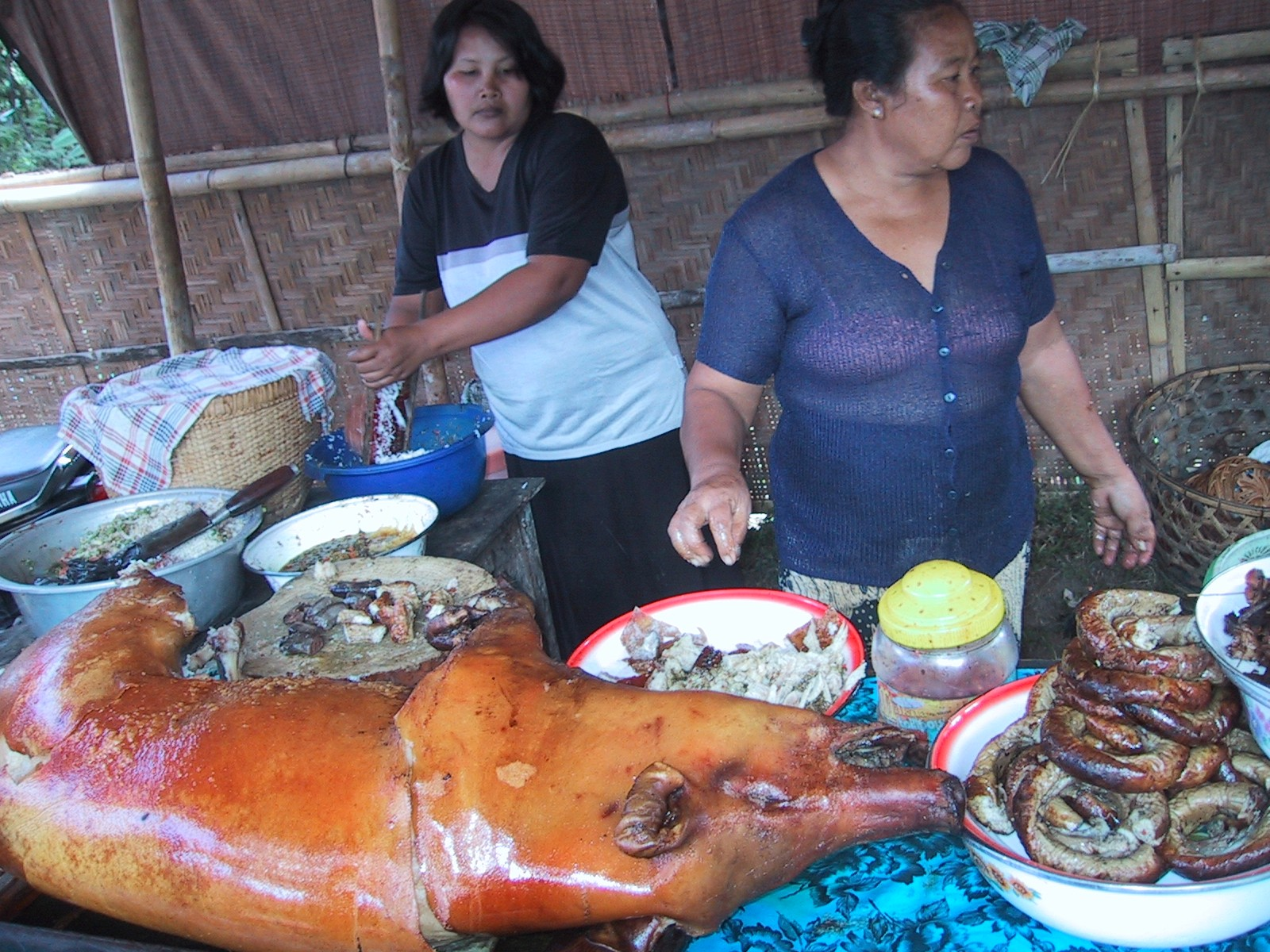
Balinese babi guling

In Indonesia, roast pig (using both adult or suckling pig) is called babi guling, babi putar, babi panggang or babi bakar; it is predominantly found in non-Muslim majority regions, such as Hindu Bali and Christian Batak lands in North Sumatra, the Minahasa people of North Sulawesi, Toraja in South Sulawesi, Papua, and also among Chinese Indonesians. In Bali, babi guling is usually served with lawar and steamed rice; it is a popular dish in Balinese restaurants and warungs. In the Batak people's tradition, babi guling is a prerequisite in wedding offerings by the bride's family. In Papua, pigs and yams are roasted in heated stones placed in a hole dug in the ground and covered with leaves; this cooking method is called bakar batu (burning the stone), and it is an important cultural and social event among Papuan people. Among Dani communities, bakar batu is central to major communal ceremonies and celebrations, including marriages, funerals, and harvest thanksgivings.

=== Philippines ===
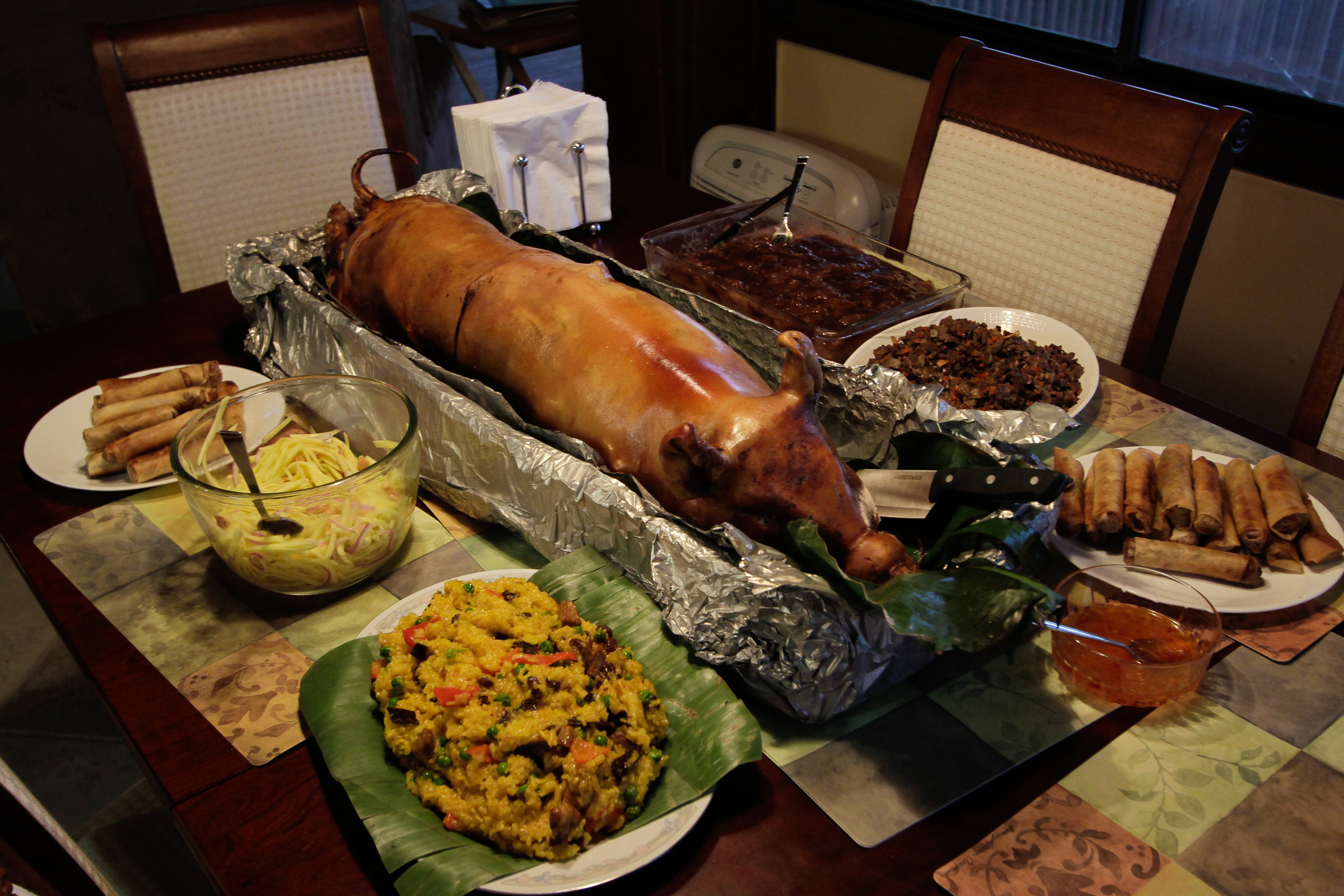
Typical traditional noche buena (Christmas Eve) meal in the Philippines, with a lechón as the centerpiece

In most regions of the Philippines, whole-roasted pig is known by the Spanish-derived term lechón (usually spelled lechon without diacritics, but also litson or lichon). It is traditionally prepared throughout the year for special occasions, festivals, and the holidays. Although it acquired the Spanish name, Philippine lechon has pre-Hispanic origins as pigs are one of the native domesticated animals of all Austronesian cultures and were carried throughout the Austronesian Expansion to Polynesia. It differs from Spanish and Latin American lechón in its ingredients, preparation, and the fact that it uses weaned or adult pigs. It is most similar to neighboring native dishes like the Balinese babi guling (though differing in the stuffing and spices used). It is considered one of the unofficial national dishes of the Philippines.

The native name of Filipino lechón is inihaw [na baboy] in Tagalog, a general term meaning "charcoal-roasted/barbecued [pig]". Native names were also preserved in other regions until recently, like in Cebu where it was previously more commonly known as inasal until Tagalog influence changed it to lechon in the 2000s. Roasted suckling pigs are differentiated as "lechon de leche" (which in Spanish would be a linguistic redundancy). The dish that is explicitly derived from the Spanish lechón style of cooking is known as cochinillo (from cochinillo asado). Unlike native Filipino lechons, cochinillo uses a suckling pig that is splayed and roasted in an oven. The term lechon has also become generalized as a loanword for anything spit-roasted over coals. It is also used for other Filipino dishes like lechon manok (native roasted chicken), lechon belly (only the pork belly), and lechon baka (a whole cow spit-roasted Filipino-style), thus lechon made from whole pig is differentiated as "lechon baboy" (literally "pig lechon").

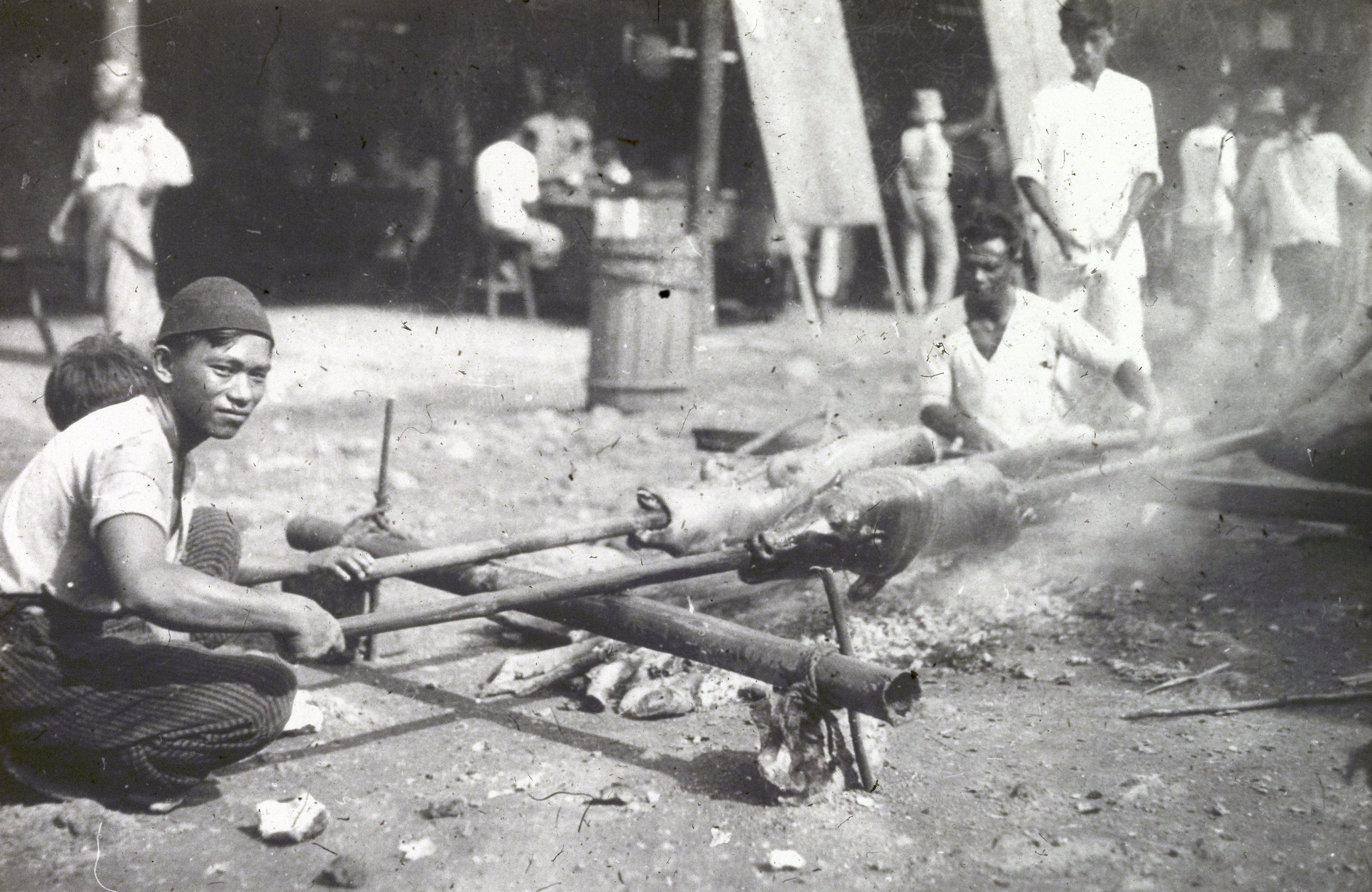
Pig roasting in the Philippines, circa 1935

There are two major methods of preparing lechon in the Philippines, the "Manila lechon" (or "Luzon lechon"), and the "Cebu lechon" (or "Visayas lechon").

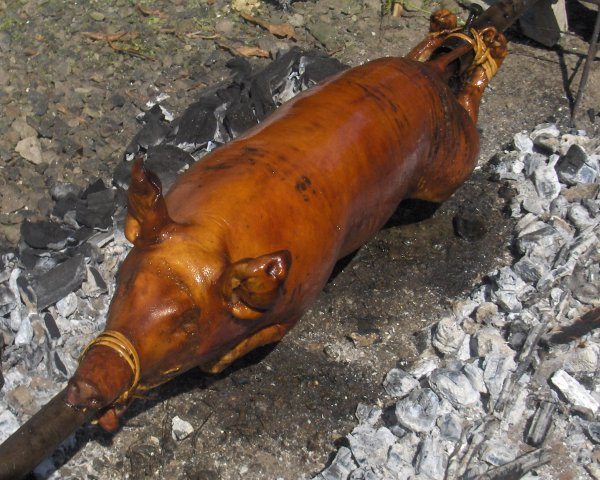
Visayan lechon being roasted in Cadiz, Negros Occidental, Philippines

Visayan lechon is prepared stuffed with herbs which usually include scallions, bay leaves, black peppercorn, garlic, salt, and distinctively tanglad (lemongrass) or leaves from native Citrus trees or tamarind trees, among other spices. A variant among Hiligaynon people also stuffs the pig with the sour fruits of batuan or binukaw (Garcinia binucao). It is usually cooked over charcoal made from coconut husks. Since it is already flavored with spices, it is served with minimal dipping sauces, like salt and vinegar or silimansi (soy sauce, calamansi, and labuyo chili).

Luzon lechon on the other hand, is typically not stuffed with herbs. When it is, it is usually just salt and pepper. Instead, the distinctiveness of Manila lechon comes from the liver-based sauce, known as the "lechon sauce". Lechon sauce is made from vinegar, brown sugar, salt, pepper, mashed liver (or liver spread), breadcrumbs, garlic and onion. Manila lechon is also typically cooked over woodfire.

Most lechon can either be cooked based on the two main versions, or mix techniques from both. Both variants also rub salt or spices unto the skin to make it crispier, as well as continually baste the lechon as it cooks. Sometimes carbonated drinks may also be used. They are cooked on a bamboo spit over charcoal for a few hours with constant (traditionally manual) turning. The pig is roasted on all sides for several hours until done. The process of cooking and basting usually results in making the pork skin crisp and is a distinctive feature of the dish.

Leftover parts from the lechon, such as the head and feet, are usually cooked into another popular dish, lechon paksiw. Like lechon itself, lechon paksiw also differs based on whether it is prepared Luzon-style or Visayas-style, with the former using liver sauce as an essential ingredient, while the latter does not. In some cases, these parts or stale lechon can be repurposed into another dish, such as Sisig.

=== Puerto Rico and Cuba ===
Pig roast (lechon asado) is very popular in many former Spanish colonies; it is a part of Puerto Rico's national dish and is usually served with arroz con gandules. In Puerto Rico & Cuba pig roasts occur year-round, but are most common at New Year's Eve and especially Christmas; occasionally if a family has moved to the United States, they will take the recipe with them and use it during the summer. In the Dominican Republic, puerco a la puya is a traditional part of the Christmas Eve meal. In Spain, the locals call this a suckling pig or a lechon asado. Hog roasts are becoming more popular across Spain and more so in Southern Spain due to the ex-pat community, as well as some of Spain's former colonies.

=== United Kingdom ===
In the UK, the tradition of pig roasting goes back to the Middle Ages and is more commonly known as a "hog roast". It is popular on many occasions, particularly parties and celebrations. It is usually an outdoor event, and a staple meal at many show events. The tradition is to roast either on a spit, turning the pig under a flame, or in a large oven in a roasting pan; roasting pigs around 130 lbs (60 kg) in weight are common in the UK. The pig is normally roasted in a propane gas machine. The pig's skin is scored with a sharp blade and covered in water and salt to make the crackling. In ancient times, dating back to the Saxons, roasting a wild boar was often the centerpiece of a meal at Yuletide, with Yule being Freya's feast. The head was often the greatest delicacy, as evidenced by the survival of the Boar's Head Carol.

=== United States ===
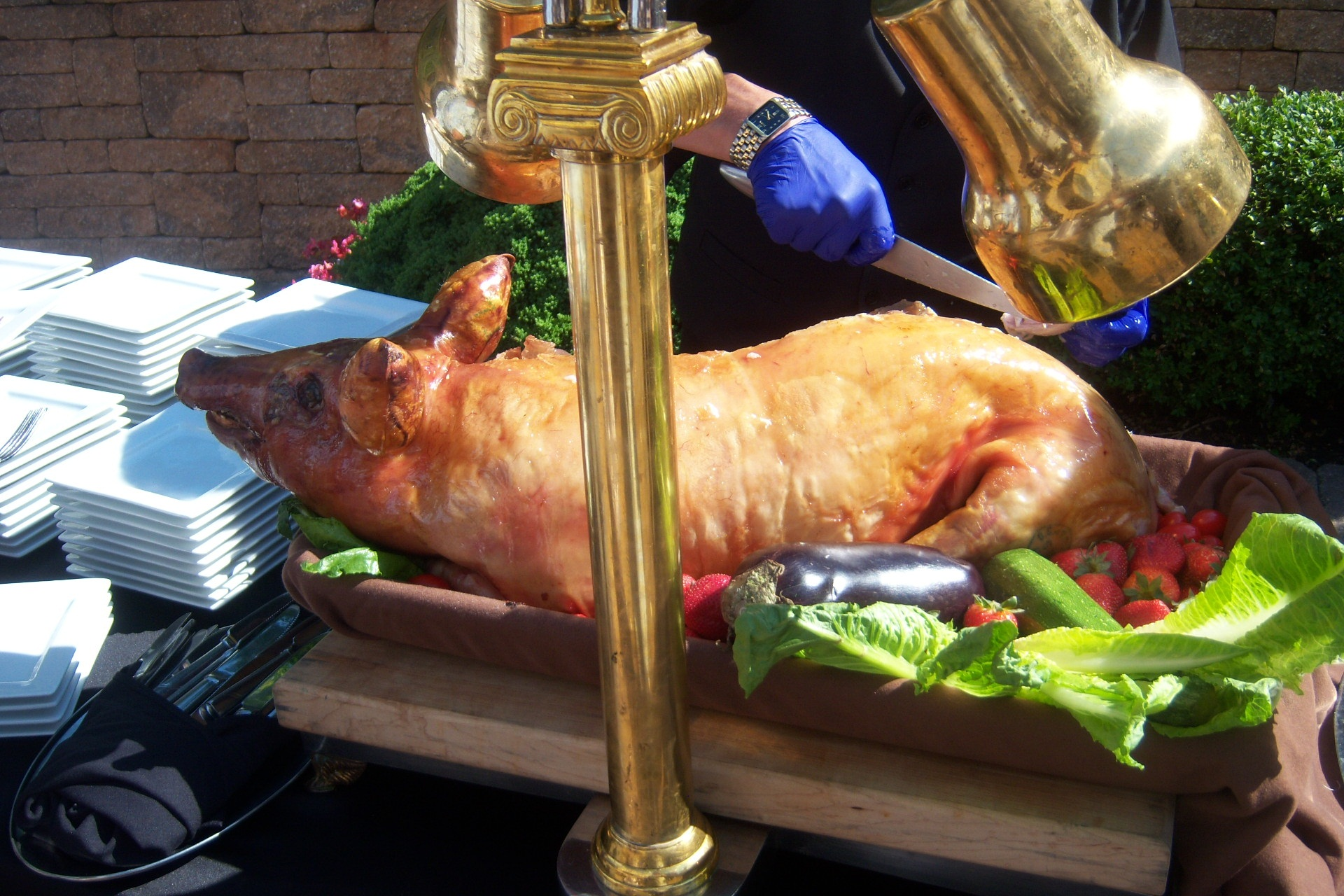
Roasted pig served at a wedding in New Jersey

In the United States, roasting a whole pig or a feral hog has been a tradition for over two hundred years, especially in the South, where it is closely linked to barbecue. From Virginia south to Florida Panhandle. and west to the Mississippi River south to Louisiana, the favored meat in Southern, Cajun, Appalachian, and Creole cooking is pork and has been since colonial times: pigs did not require any special handling or maintenance and could be sent off into the woods and rounded up again when supplies ran low, and thus were the prime choice for meat for small farmers and plantation owners, and for men living up in the mountains, the tradition was to drive their pigs to market every fall, fattening them up on the many nuts and acorns that proliferated in the area. George Washington even mentions attending a barbecue in his journal on August 4, 1769, and the records of Mount Vernon note a smokehouse on the premises. Like many plantation owners, he raised several pigs for slaughter in November and once his slaves had finished curing the meat into ham and bacon, they would pit-roast some whole pigs over hot coals as a treat. Outside of the English-speaking states of the South, francophone Cajuns, then as now, had cochon de lait as a traditional dish for the gathering of their large families.

== Cooking ==
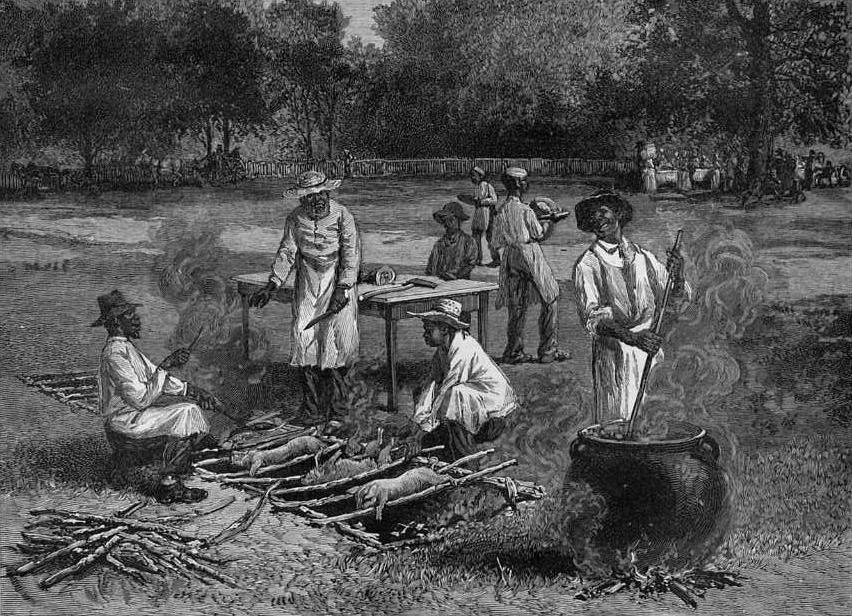
An 1887 depiction of Southern style pig roasting. The practice is not much different from present day methods.

A hog/pig, often around 80–120 pounds (35 to 45 kg) dressed weight, is split in half and spread onto a large charcoal or propane grill. The styles of grills used are as varied as the methods of producing them; some are homemade while others are custom made.

In a Hawaii-style pig roast, a large pit is typically dug into the ground and lined with banana leaves, as lava rocks are heated over an open flame until they are very hot. The heated rocks are placed into the pit, and a seasoned pig is placed inside and covered with additional banana leaves, which serve as insulation and for flavor.

In an American Cuban-style pig roast, the "caja china" is the most commercially popular method by which to roast a whole pig. In its more traditional form, a roasting box is commonly fashioned above ground out of concrete blocks and steel mesh. Another popular method is to use a pig roasting box, the oldest and best known brand of which is "La Caja China". The cooking process is communal and usually done by men; the host is helped by friends or family. It usually takes four to eight hours to cook the pig completely; the pig is often started "meat-side" down, and then is flipped one time once the hog has stopped dripping rendered fat. When the cooking is complete, the meat should ideally be tender to the point of falling off of the bone. The meat is then either chopped or pulled or is picked off the roasted pig by the guests.

In the Philippines, the pig is typically stuffed with spices, placed on a bamboo spit, and roasted over hot coals.

In Puerto Rico, pig roast is prepared in adobo mojado (wet seasoning) containing crushed garlic, black pepper, salt, orégano brujo, olive oil, and wine vinegar.

== See also ==
- Sinalau
- Siu yuk
- List of pork dishes
- List of cooking techniques
- List of spit-roasted foods
