= Fetal pig =

Unborn pigs utilized in biology classes

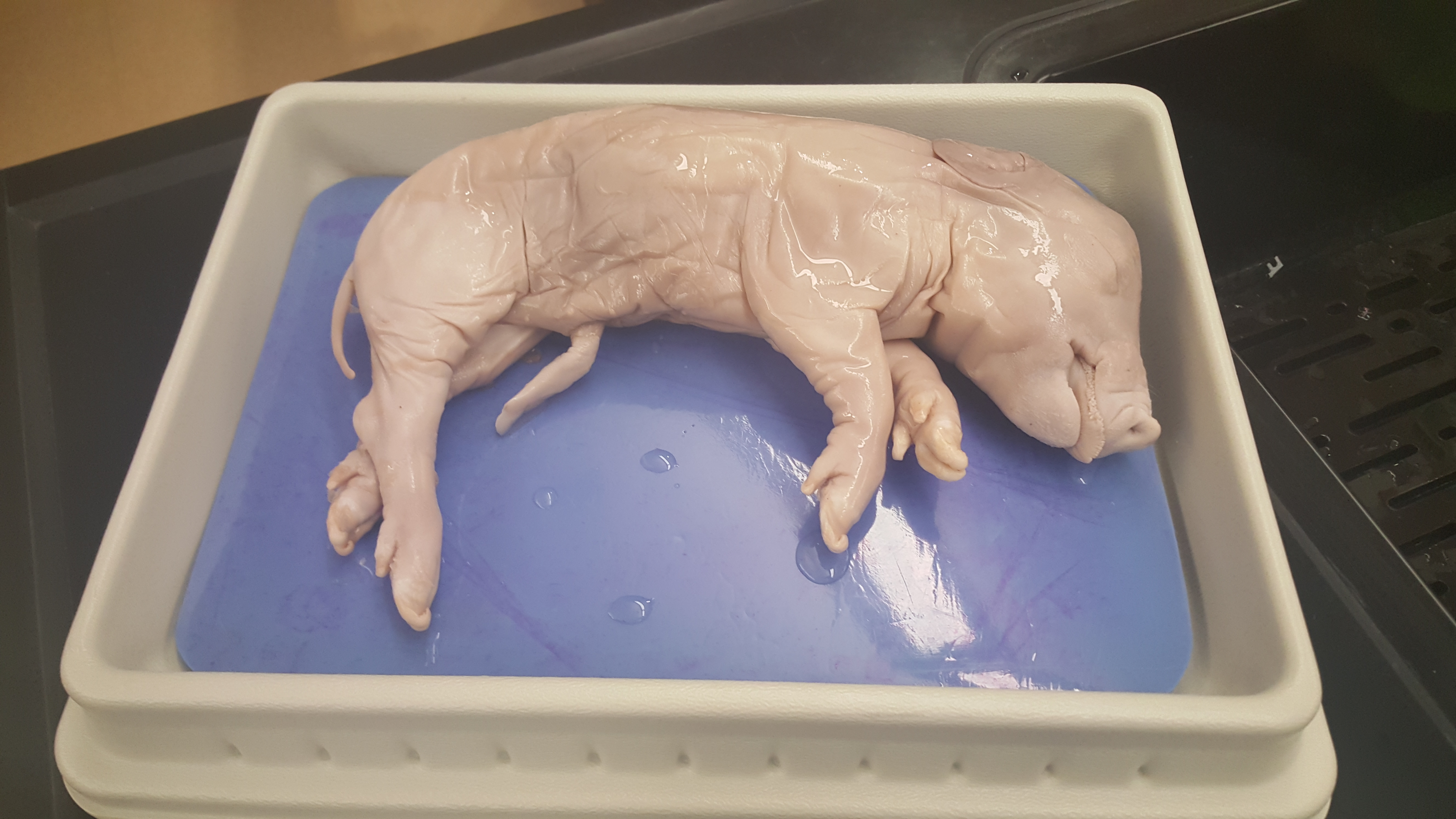
External view of a fetal pig

Fetal pigs are unborn pigs used in elementary as well as advanced biology classes as objects for dissection. Pigs, as a mammalian species, provide a good specimen for the study of physiological systems and processes due to the similarities between many pig and human organs.

== Use in biology labs ==
Along with frogs and earthworms, fetal pigs are among the most common animals used in classroom dissection. There are several reasons for this, including that pigs, like humans, are mammals. Shared traits include common hair, mammary glands, live birth, similar organ systems, metabolic levels, and basic body form. They also allow for the study of fetal circulation, which differs from that of an adult. Fetal pigs are easy to obtain at a relatively low price because they are by-products of the meat-packing industry. These pigs are not bred and killed for this purpose, but are extracted from the deceased sow's uterus. Fetal pigs not used in classroom dissections are often used in fertilizer or simply discarded. Fourthly, fetal pigs are easy to dissect because of their soft tissue and incompletely developed bones that are still made of cartilage. In addition, they are relatively large with well-developed organs that are easily visible.

=== Alternatives ===
Several peer-reviewed comparative studies have concluded that the educational outcomes of students who are taught basic and advanced biomedical concepts and skills using non-animal methods are equivalent or superior to those of their peers who use animal-based laboratories such as animal dissection. A systematic review concluded that students taught using non-animal methods demonstrated "superior understanding of complex biological processes, increased learning efficiency, and increased examination results." It also reported that students' confidence and satisfaction increased as did their preparedness for laboratories and their information-retrieval and communication abilities.

Three studies at universities across the United States found that students who modeled body systems out of clay were significantly better at identifying the constituent parts of human anatomy than their classmates who performed animal dissection. Another study found that students preferred using clay modeling over animal dissection and performed just as well as their cohorts who dissected animals.

== Development ==
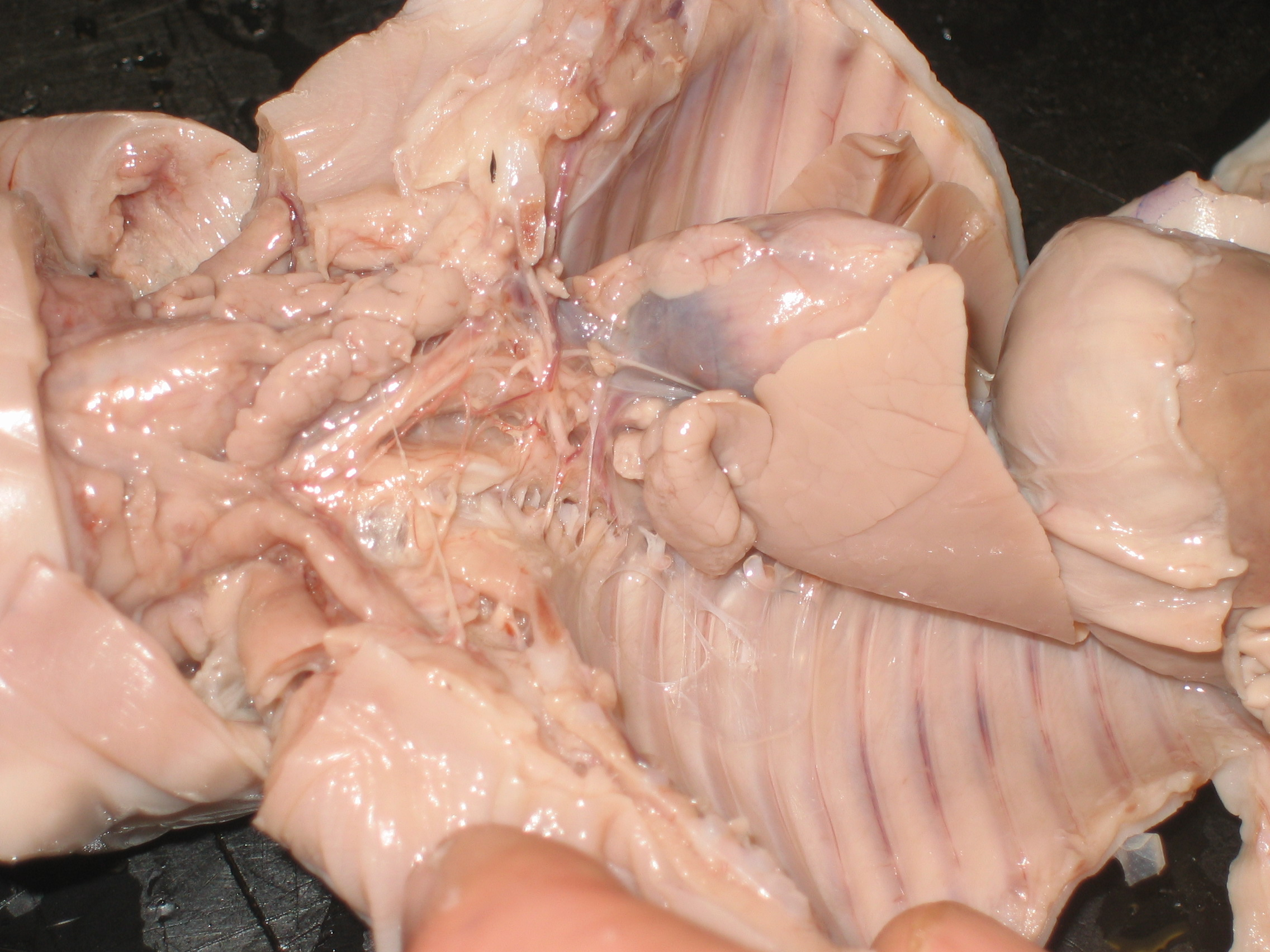
Fetal pig being dissected, showing the thoracic cavity, including the rib cage, the heart in the pericardium, the lungs, the diaphragm, part of the liver, and all the organs under the neck

The size of the fetal pig depends on the time allowed for the mother to gestate:

| Size | Time |
|---|---|
| 80 mm | 68 days |
| 100 mm | 75 days |
| 158 mm | 86 days |
| 220 mm | 100 days |
| 300 mm | 114 days |

=== Nutrition ===
No studies have found significant data regarding the mother swine's diet and fetal pig survival rate. However, there is a correlation between a mother pig having a nutritious diet containing proteins, vitamins and minerals during gestation period and the survival rate of piglets. The correlation, however, is not statistically different. Weight is also not a factor of survival rate because a healthier diet does not lead to a heavier offspring or a greater chance of live birth.

=== Placental development ===
The placenta is used as a means of transferring nutrients from the mother to the fetus. The efficiency at which nutrients are transferred dictates the health and growth of the fetus. Fetal weight/placental weight ratio, was commonly used to determine placental efficiency. Instead, a more accurate way of determining fetus growth is through certain characteristics of the placental lining. The placenta is made of a folded trophoblast/endometrial epithelial bilayer. The width and length of the placenta folds are positively related and increase as gestation progresses.

The width of the placental folds decreases until day 85 of gestation. From here, the width increases with gestation and is at its largest around day 105. The rate at which these folds increase is negatively related to fetus size. Thus, greater fold widths will be seen in smaller fetuses. Although increasing placental fold width does increase the interaction between fetus and mother, nutrient exchange is not most efficient in smaller fetal pigs, as would be expected. Many other factors, including depth of placental folds, are also responsible for these interactions.

=== Prenatal development ===
The prenatal development of the fetus includes all the tissue and organ development. Within hours of mating, the sperm and egg undergo fertilization in the oviduct and three days later the egg moves into the uterus. The cells begin to specialize by day six, and attach themselves to the uterus lining by day eleven. From fertilization to day 18, the endoderm, ectoderm and mesoderm have been forming inside the embryo, and are completely formed by day 18, the same day the placenta forms. The endoderm transforms into the lungs, trachea, thyroid gland, and digestive tract of the fetus. The ectoderm has a greater role in the development of the fetus. It forms into the skin, nervous system, enamel of the teeth, lining of the intestine, mammary and sweat glands, hoofs, and hair. The mesoderm forms the major organ components that help keep the fetus alive. It forms the muscles and connective tissues of the body, blood vessels and cells, the skeleton, kidneys, adrenal glands, heart, and the reproductive organs. By day 20, most of the major organs are visible, and the last half of gestation focuses greatly on increasing the size of the fetuses.

=== Development of lymphoid and haematopoiesis tissues ===
The development of the lymphatic system and the formation of blood circulation occur at different stages of fetal pig development. The first lymphatic organ to become present is the thymus. Lymphocyte builds up in the spleen on the 70th day. By day 77, the thymus is already completely developed and is distinguishable from other organs. Also, follicles are present on the tongue and intestines on day 77. On the 84th day, Periarteriolar lymphoid sheaths appear in the fetal pig. By this time, the liver and bone marrow are active and functional.

=== Environmental effects on swine reproductive performance ===
Studies have shown that litter size, the amount of floor space during the growing period, and the number of pigs the gilt, or female pig, is placed with while growing affect the reproduction rates of the gilts. Data from a study in 1976 by Nelson and Robinson showed that gilts from a small litter size ovulated more than the gilts from the larger litters. The study suggests stress plays a role in impacting the reproduction. The amount of floor space has been shown to impact the time it takes gilts to reach puberty. An adequate amount of floor space allowed the higher percentage of gilts to reach puberty sooner than those gilts who had less floor space. The gilts placed in smaller groups bore one more pig per litter than gilts in larger groups. Still, the environment in which the fetal gilt develops is significant to the reproductive and physiological development.

== Preservation ==
Fetal pigs are often preserved in formaldehyde, a carcinogenic substance. A 1980 study found that exposure to formaldehyde could possibly cause nasal cancer in rats, leading to research on whether this was possible in humans or not. In 1995 it was concluded by the International Agency for Research on Cancer (IARC) that formaldehyde is a carcinogen for humans.

== Anatomy ==
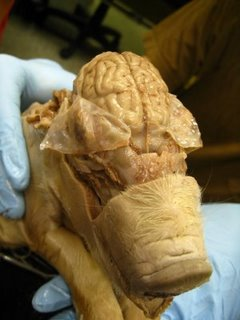
Fetal pig brain situated in the cranium

The anatomy of a fetal pig is similar to that of the adult pig in various aspects. Systems that are similar include the nervous, skeletal, respiratory (neglecting the under developed diaphragm), and muscular. Other important body systems have significant differences from the adult pig.

=== Circulatory system ===
There are only a few differences between the circulatory system of an adult pig and a fetal pig, besides from the umbilical arteries and vein. There is a shunt between the wall of the right and left atrium called the foramen ovale. This allows blood to pass directly from the right to left atrium. There is also the ductus arteriosus which allows blood from the right atrium to be diverted to the aortic arch. Both of these shunts close a few minutes after birth.

=== Digestive ===
The monogastric digestive system of the fetal pig harbors many similarities with many other mammals. The fetal pig's digestive organs are well developed before birth, although it does not ingest food. These organs include the esophagus, stomach, small and large intestines. Mesenteries serve to connect the organs of the fetal pig together. In order for digestion to occur, the fetal pig would have to ingest food. Instead, it gains much needed nutrition from the mother pig via the umbilical cord. In the adult pig, food will follow the general flow through the esophagus, which can be located behind the tracheae. From the oral cavity, the esophagus leads to the stomach, small intestine, and large intestine. Other organs developing during fetal pig development such as the gallbladder, pancreas and spleen are all critical in contributing to the overall flow of the digestive system because they contain digestive enzymes that will perform chemical digestion of food. After food is digested and nutrients are absorbed, the food follows through the large intestine and solid wastes are excreted through the anus. In the fetal pig however, the metabolic wastes are sent back to the mother through the umbilical cord where the mother excretes the wastes. Other remaining wastes remain in the fetal pig until birth. Then

The oral cavity of the fetal pig begins developing before birth. The tongue's taste buds, located in the enlarged papillae, facilitate food handling after birth. These taste buds develop during fetal development. Adult pigs have up to 15,000 taste buds, a much larger number than the average human tongue, which has 9,000.

The dental anatomy of the fetal pig shows differences from adult pigs. The fetal pig develops primary teeth (which are later replaced with permanent teeth). Some may erupt during fetal stage, which is why some of the fetuses show evidence of teeth. Depending on the age of the fetal pig, it is natural to see eruptions of third incisor and canine in the fetal pig. Because the fetal pigs were still in the mother's uterus, teeth will still form which supports reasons for hollow unerupted teeth that may be seen. Similar to human dental anatomy, the overall dental anatomy of the pig consists of incisors, canines, pre-molars, and molars. Piglets can have 28 teeth total and adult pigs can have 44 teeth total.

=== Urogenital ===
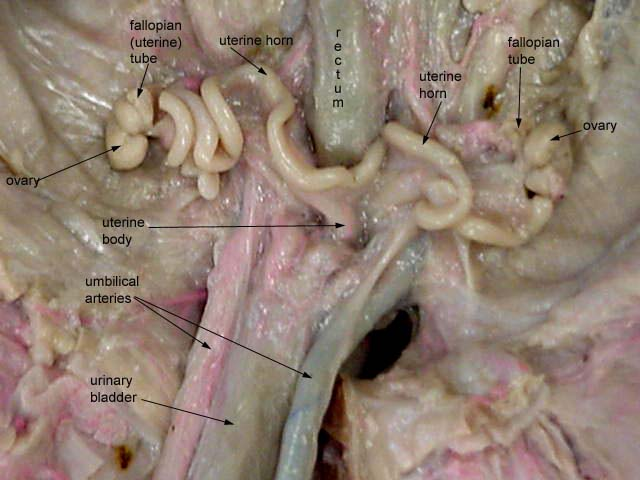
Reproductive system of a female fetal pig

The fetal pig's urogenital system is similar to the adult pig's system with the exception of the reproductive organs. The fetal pig urinary tract is relatively developed and easy to locate during dissection. The kidneys are located behind the abdominal organs and are partially embedded into the dorsal body wall by the spine. The ureters carry the urine to the urinary bladder, the large sack-like organ by the umbilical artery and vein, to the urethra. From there, the urine can be excreted.

==== Female ====
If the fetal pig is a female, there will be a fleshy protrusion ventral near the anus called the genital papilla. The female's internal reproductive system is located below the kidneys. The two sac-like organs attached to the coil-like fallopian tubes are the ovaries. The uterus, which becomes the vagina, is located where the fallopian tubes meet. This system can be difficult to find as it is small as well as extremely dorsal and posterior to the other systems.

==== Male ====
Male fetal pigs have an urogenital opening located behind the umbilical cord. The swelling behind the hind legs of the fetal pig is the scrotum. The male's internal reproductive system has two scrotal sacs, which depending on the age of the fetal pig may or may not have developed testes. The epididymis coil on the testes connects to the vas deferens. The vas deferens crosses over the ureter and enters the urethra, which then connects to the penis located just posterior to the skin. Similar to the female system, it may be difficult to identify all parts.

== See also ==
- Suckling pig – Piglet fed on its mother's milk
