= Siu yuk =

Variety of roast pork in Cantonese cuisine

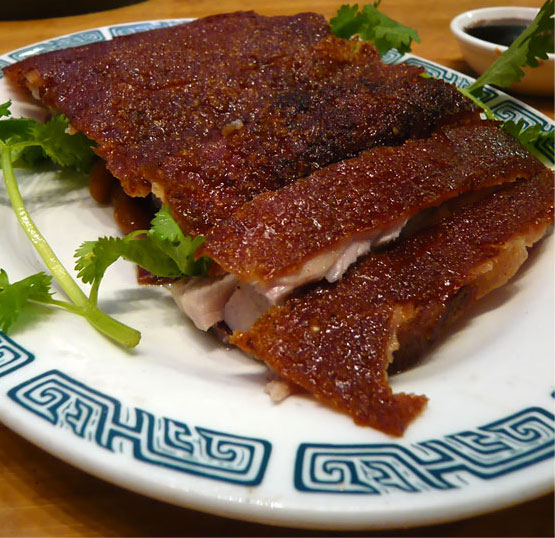
- Sliced roasted pig
- Chinese: 燒肉
- Literal meaning: roasted meat
Transcriptions
Standard Mandarin
- Hanyu Pinyin: shāo ròu
Yue: Cantonese
- Yale Romanization: sīu yuhk
- Jyutping: siu1 juk6

Siu yuk (Chinese: 燒肉; Jyutping: siu1 juk6; Cantonese Yale: sīu yuhk; pinyin: shāo ròu; lit. 'roast meat') is a variety of siu mei, or roasted meat dishes, in Cantonese cuisine.

== Description ==
Siu yuk is made by roasting an entire pig with seasonings, such as salt and vinegar in a charcoal furnace at high temperature. Roasted pigs of high quality have crisp skin and juicy and tender meat. Usually the meat is served plain with its skin, but it is sometimes served with mustard, soy sauce or hoisin sauce.

== Terminology ==
When individual pieces are served, it is known as "roasted meat" (Chinese: 燒肉; Jyutping: siu1 juk6; Cantonese Yale: sīu yuhk; pinyin: shāo ròu). When the entire pig is served, the dish is known as "roasted pig" (Chinese: 燒豬; Jyutping: siu1 zyu1; Cantonese Yale: sīu jyū; pinyin: shāo zhū). In most cases it is referred to by the former term since it is always consumed in small quantities.

== Regional ==
=== Southern China ===
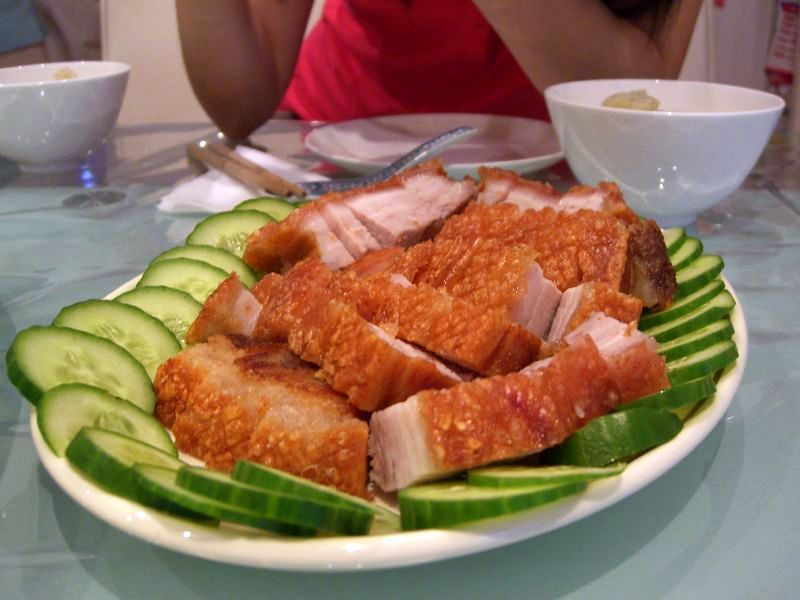
Another dish of roasted pork

The southern Chinese style of cooking is nearly identical between the south parts of mainland China and Hong Kong. Sometimes, the entire pig is purchased for the sake of special family affairs, business openings, or as a ritualistic spiritual offering. For example, in the entertainment industry in Hong Kong, one tradition is to offer one or several whole roast pigs to the Jade Emperor to celebrate a film's opening with a roast pig; the pig is sacrificed to ward off negative reviews from critics in return to pray for the film's success.

One garnish used to make the dish look more appealing is to decorate the roast pig with circular slices of pineapple and glacé cherries for eyes. The roast pig is often presented in red wrapping paper and a red box for luck.

== See also ==
- Char siu
- Pig roast
- Siu mei
- Suckling pig
- Chicharrón
- Mu Krop
