= Suckling pig =

Piglet fed on its mother's milk

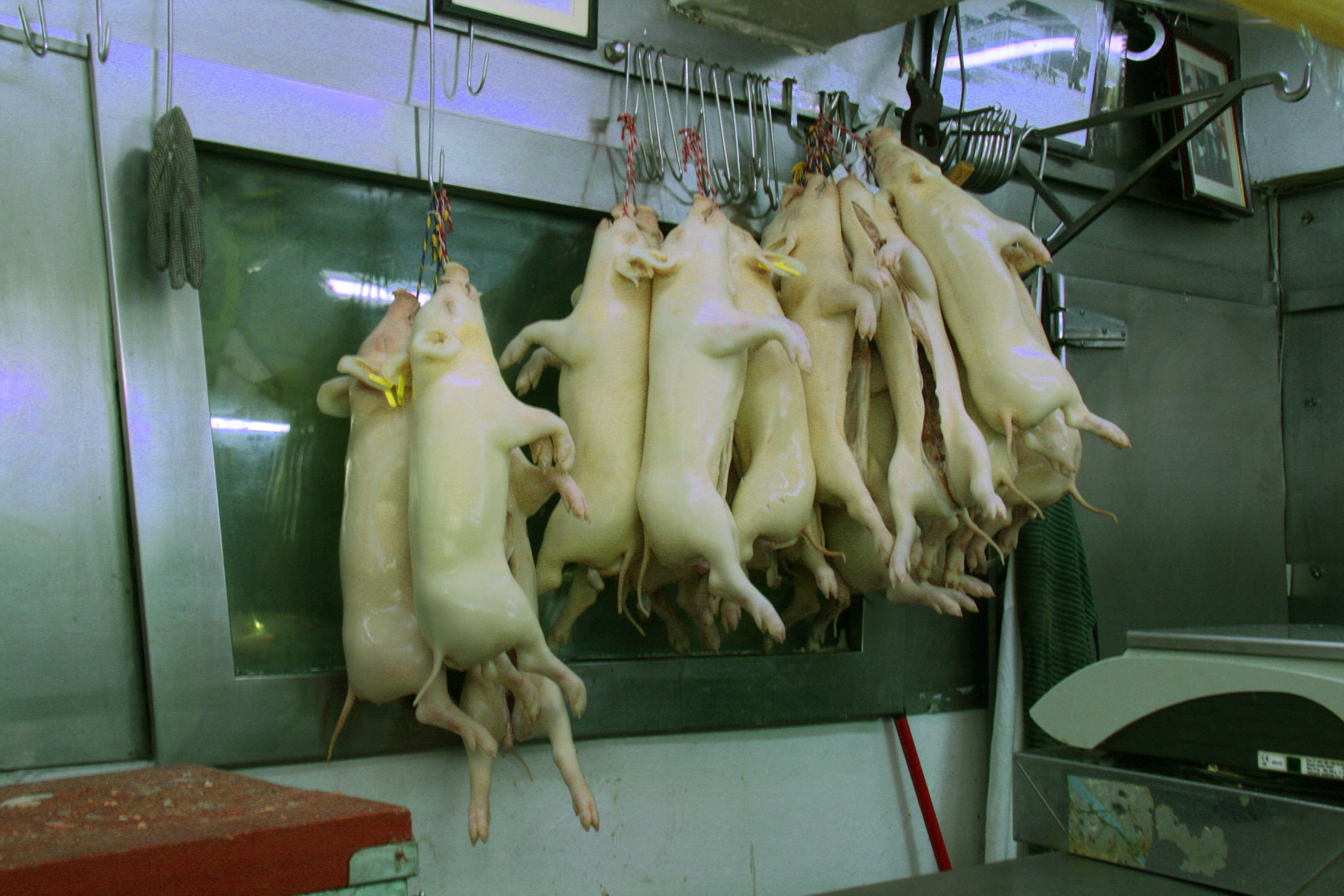
Slaughtered piglets in Madrid market

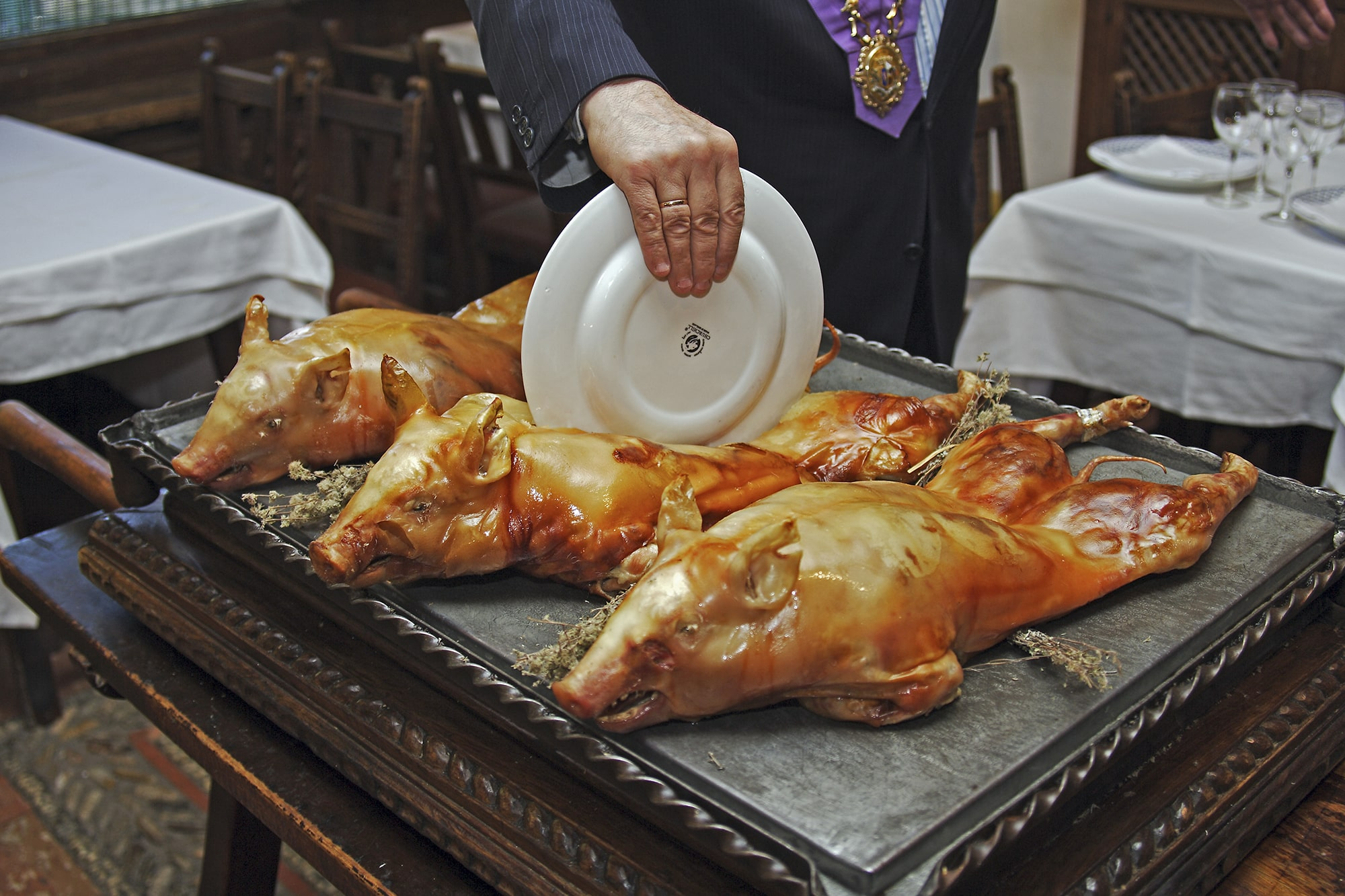
Roast sucking-pigs, Segovia, Spain

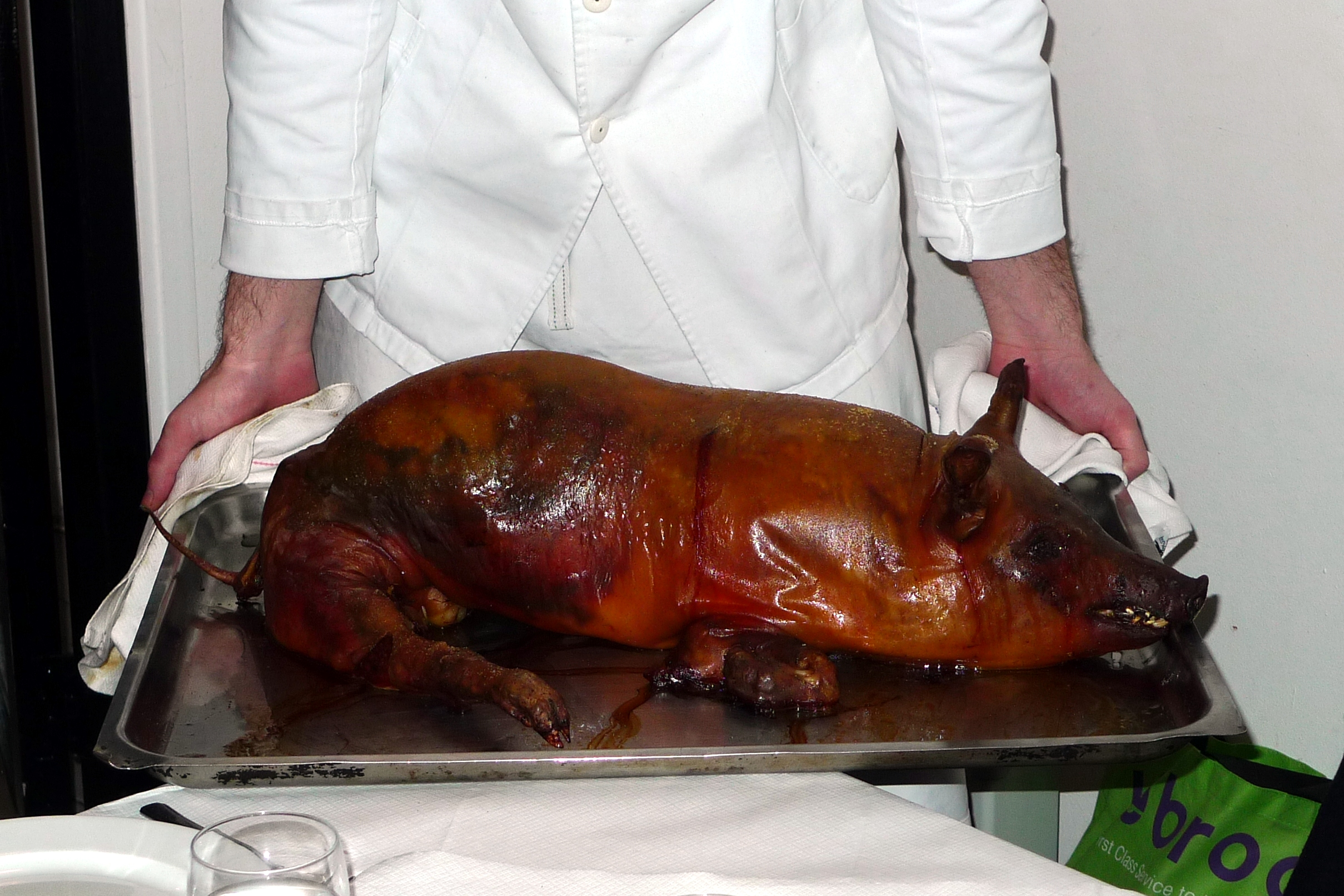
Sucking-pig served at St John restaurant, London

A sucking-pig (BrE) or suckling pig (AmE) is a piglet fed on its mother's milk (i.e., a piglet which is still being "suckled"). In culinary contexts, a sucking-pig is slaughtered before the end of its second month. Celebrated since Greek and Roman times, it is traditionally cooked whole, usually roasted, in various cuisines, and is often prepared for special occasions and gatherings.

A variation is popular in Spain and Portugal and their former empires under the name lechón (Spanish) or leitão (Portuguese), but the dish is common to many countries in Europe, the Americas and east Asia. Its popularity in Britain and the US has declined since the 19th century.

== Definition and preparation ==
According to Larousse Gastronomique, a piglet – in French a porcelet – is defined as a sucking-pig if it is below the age of two months. The Oxford Dictionary of Food and Nutrition defines the age as four to five weeks. It may weigh as little as three or four kilos (6.6 – 8.8 lbs). Mrs Beeton recommended putting the slaughtered piglet into cold water briefly and then immersing it in boiling water, before pulling off the hair and removing the entrails. In his 1907 Guide to Modern Cookery, Auguste Escoffier wrote, "Stuffed or not stuffed, sucking pigs are always roasted whole, and the essential point of the procedure is that they should be just done when their skin is crisp and golden".

== History ==
16th-century multilingual dictionary giving the words for "sucking-pig" in Latin, Greek, German, French, Italian, Spanish and English

Many recipes for sucking-pig survive from ancient times. Andrew Dalby in his Siren Feasts: A History of Food and Gastronomy in Greece (1996) draws attention to the precise and differentiated Greek vocabulary for categorising pigs of varying ages and sizes, and observes that "sucking-pigs, galathenoi, were a particular delicacy". Ancient Chinese and Roman cuisine valued the dish: Alan Davidson comments, "the Romans certainly liked sucking pig". In her 1985 Food and Cooking in Roman Britain, Jane Renfrew writes, "Sucking pig was roasted in the oven and then served with a thickened sauce flavoured with pepper, lovage, caraway, celery seed, asafoetida root, rue, liquamen, wine must and olive oil". Apicius's fifth-century cookery book De re coquinaria (About Cooking) contains several recipes for sucking-pig, including porcellum assum tractomelinum (stuffed with pastry and honey) and porcellum farsilem duobus generis (stuffed in two ways – one stuffing being a mixture of pepper, lovage, oregano, celery seed, cumin, fennel seed and rosemary, and the other containing laser root, cooked brains, raw eggs and boiled spelt). The sucking-pig appears in early texts such as the sixth-century Salic law. (Note: As an example of a law governing the punishment for theft, Title 2, article 1, is, in Latin, Si quis porcellum lactantem furaverit, et ei fuerit adprobatum (malb. chrane calcium hoc est) CXX dinarios qui faciunt solidos III culpabilis iudicetur. "If someone has stolen a suckling pig and this is proven against him, the guilty party will be sentenced to 120 denarii which adds up to three solidi (Latin coins)." The words chrane calcium are written in Frankish; calcium (or galza in other manuscripts) is the gloss for "suckling pig"; porcellum lactantem.)

The first recorded use of the term in English dates from 1553: "Yonge suckynge pygges, porci delici". The Oxford Companion to Food (OCF) comments, "Sucking pigs are sometimes referred to as suckling pigs; this is incorrect, since it is the mothers who suckle and the young who suck". (Note: John Ayto in his Diner's Dictionary (2012) argues that the use of "suckling" to mean sucking milk from the teat rather than giving it goes back to the seventeenth century, though he provides no evidence for this and sticks to the traditional English "sucking pig" in his book.) In the sixteenth century a common alternative term was "roasting pigs". Sucking-pigs were widely used in medieval cookery, and when it became more usual for pigs to be farmed than hunted in forests a larger proportion would be killed and sold as sucking-pigs. In the 18th century Hannah Glasse and in the 19th century Mrs Beeton published recipes for them, "always the most favoured way of cooking them"; Mrs Beeton stipulates, "A sucking-pig, to be eaten in perfection, should not be more than three weeks old, and should be dressed the same day that it is killed". The OCF adds, "in recent times sucking-pig has become less and less usual in England and the USA".

== Regional dishes ==
There are many variations in Western and Asian cuisines:

=== Europe, except Iberia ===
In his 366 Menus and 1200 Recipes in French and English (1884) the French gourmet Baron Brisse includes "cochon de lait rôti – roast sucking-pig". He suggests stuffing the piglet with fresh butter seasoned with chopped herbs, salt and pepper or with chopped liver, bacon, mushrooms, capers, mixed herbs, salt and pepper. Cochon de lait Saint-Fortunat is stuffed with a mixture of cooked barley, the piglet's liver, herbs, chipolata sausages and braised chestnuts and roasted. Other French versions of sucking-pig are:

- cochon de lait à l'américain (stuffed with a mixture of liver and sausage meat);
- —à l'alsacienne (Alsatian style) – stuffed with pork sausage meat mixed with braised sauerkraut and the diced sautéed pork liver, roasted
- —à la bavaroise (Bavarian style) – brushed with oil and roasted, deglazed with thick veal gravy and served with potato dumplings and coleslaw made with diced bacon
- —à l'anglaise (English style) – filled with sage and onion stuffing, roasted; apple sauce mixed with blanched currants served separately
- —à l'allemande (German style) – stuffed with apple slices and currants, roasted; à l'italienne (Italian style) boned, stuffed with risotto mixed with grated Parmesan and diced salami, roasted
- —à la farce de foie de porc (with liver stuffing) – stuffed with a mixture of butter, eggs, soaked bread and the piglet's boiled chopped liver. seasoned with nutmeg and roasted
- —à la piemontaise (Piedmont style) – stuffed with risotto mixed with grated white truffles, roasted; served with a light tomato sauce
- —à la polonaise (Polish style) – stuffed with braised shredded cabbage mixed with diced ham and roasted
- —aux pruneaux (with prunes) – stuffed with stoned half-cooked prunes mixed with marjoram and roasted
- —à la russe (Russian style) – roasted unseasoned and basted with sour cream; carved and served on buckwheat sauce mixed with the cooked diced liver and diced hard-boiled eggs.

Anne Willan writes that cooks in Alsace generally serve sucking pig hot, those in the adjoining Lorraine tend to braise it and serve it chilled in a clear jelly flavoured with white wine. French cuisine also includes a recipe for sucking-pig's trotters (pieds de cochon de lait à la tchèque – Czech style) in which the trotters are cooked in beer with caraway seeds. Elizabeth David records as "one of the best dishes of its type I have yet tasted" a galantine from Lorraine, consisting of a whole sucking-pig chopped up with white wine, vegetables, spices and herbs. She mentions also "the famous porcelet en gelée, an elegant brawn of sucking pig which makes a fine hors d'œuvre ... in which pieces of pork lie embedded in a crystal clear jelly".

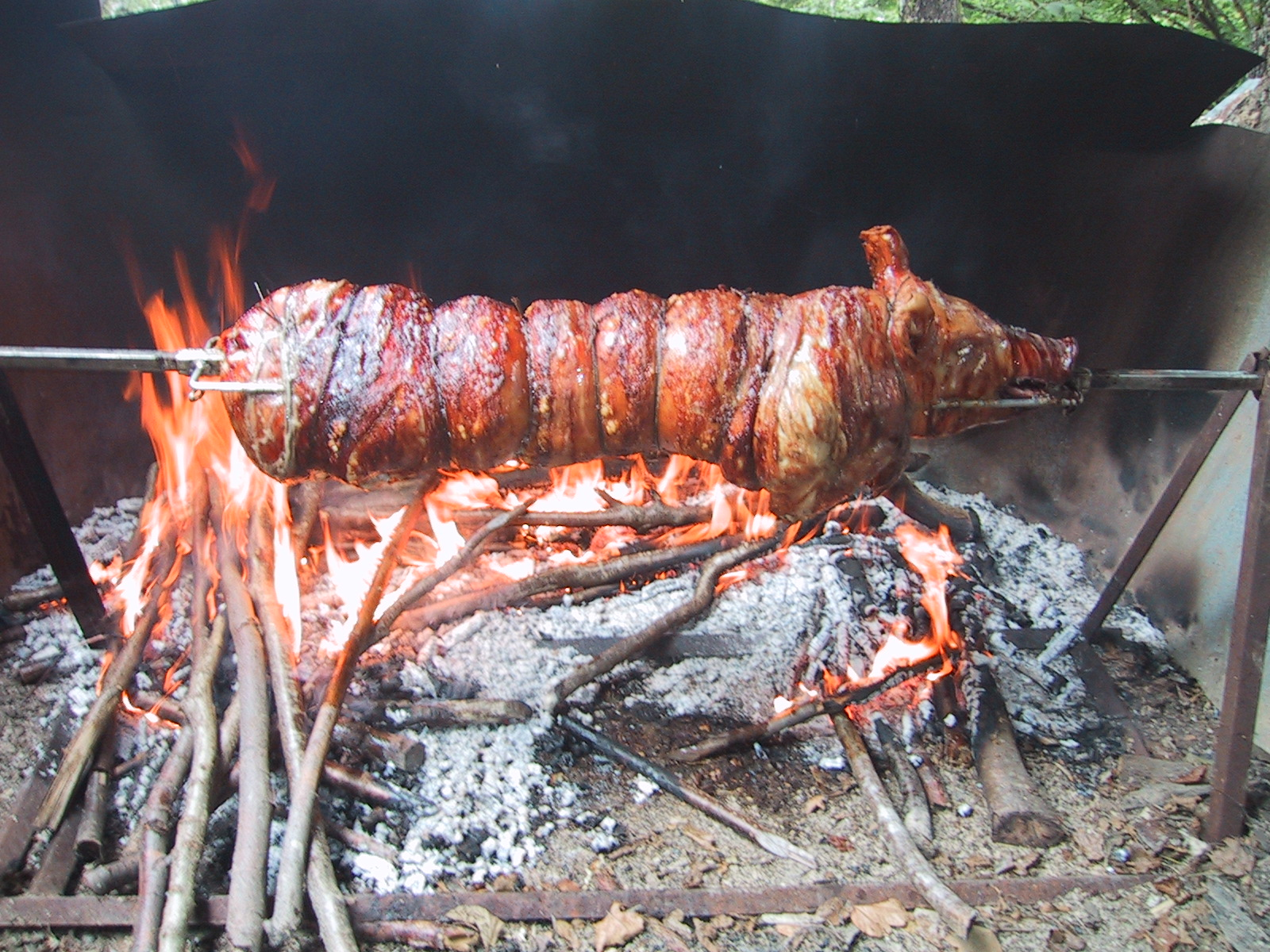
Northern Italian barbecue

In Italy there are several terms for a sucking-pig: maialino, porcetto, porcellino di latte, or lattonzolo. Porchetta is a sucking-pig stuffed, flavoured with garlic and rosemary, spit-roasted whole and served in slices. The Sardinian porceddu is flavoured with myrtle and spit-roasted whole. Mantecato al maialino is a creamy Carnaroli risotto with sucking-pig and Parmesan.

Roast sucking-pig is known in German, Austrian and German-Swiss cuisines as gebratenes Spanferkel. It is often served at festive occasions such as the Oktoberfest. Rheinisches Spanferkel (Rhine sucking-pig) is roast, basted with beer, and served with a stuffing of butter, veal, bacon, liver, bread, onions, eggs, and herbs, flavoured with nutmeg and Madeira.

Hungarian cuisine includes not only roast sucking-pig (malac sülve) but sucking-pig soup (malacaprólék-leves) and sucking-pig jelly (malackocsonya). Until the mid-20th century prosię adziewane (roast stuffed sucking-pig) was a traditional Polish Easter dish, which might be stuffed with liver (farsz podróbkowy), buckwheat (farsz z kaszy gryczanej) or raisin and almond (farsz z rodzynków i migdalów). Roast sucking-pig is known as Пeчeно прасe (pecheno prase) in Bulgaria, and purcel mic la gratăr in Romania. The Greek version is γουρουνόπουλο γάλακτος (ghurounopulou ghalaktos).

In Sweden sucking-pig is called spädgris; it is usually cooked in the oven, or sometimes roasted directly over a fire. It is often stuffed with various fruits such as apples and plums, together with butter and breadcrumbs. Russian recipes for sucking-pig include braising Estonian-style in a mixture of sherry and broth, roasting Russian-style, stuffed with giblets and buckwheat, and stuffed with apple and served with a buckwheat and horseradish sauce.

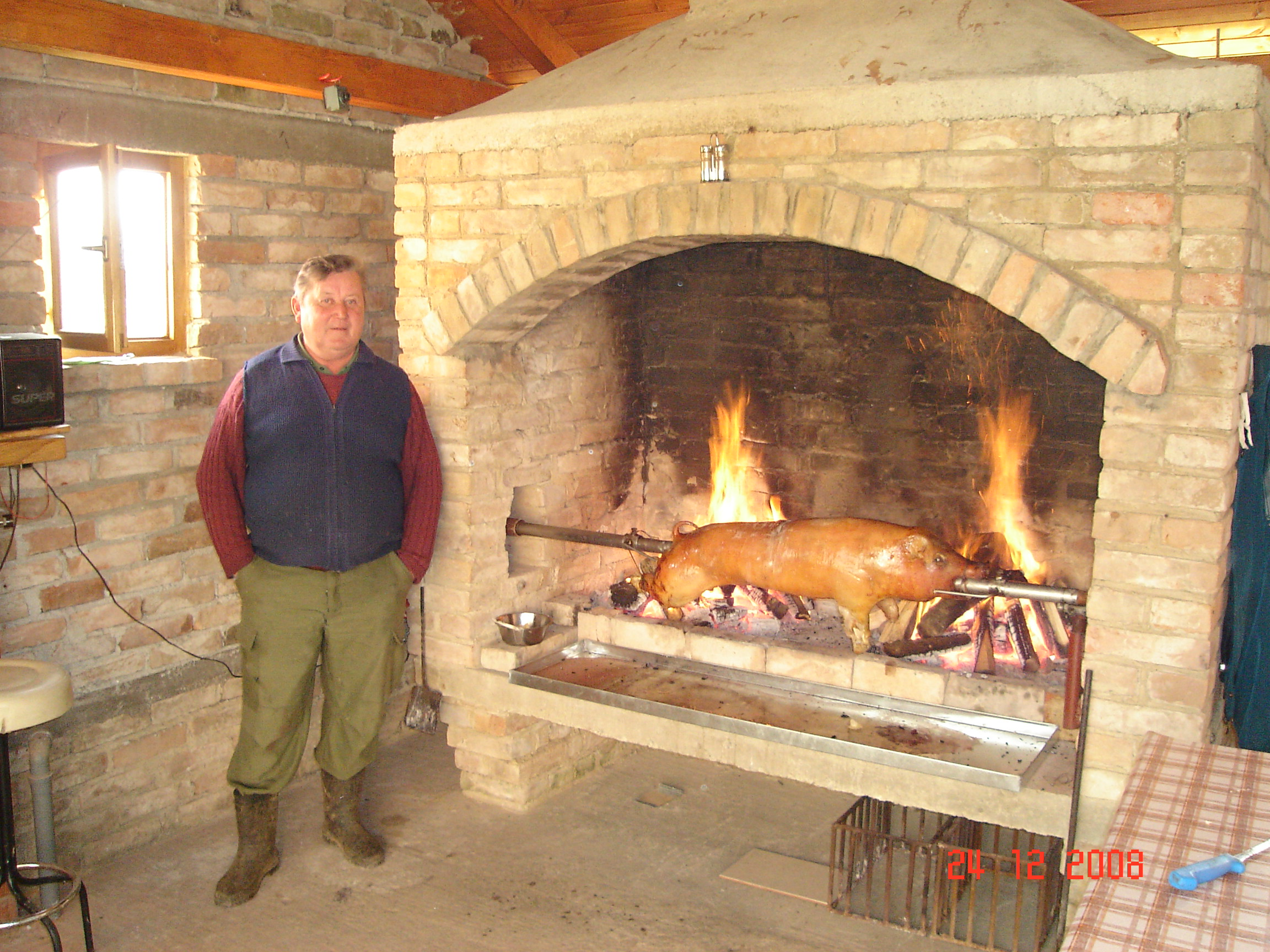
Odojak na ražnju, Croatian cuisine

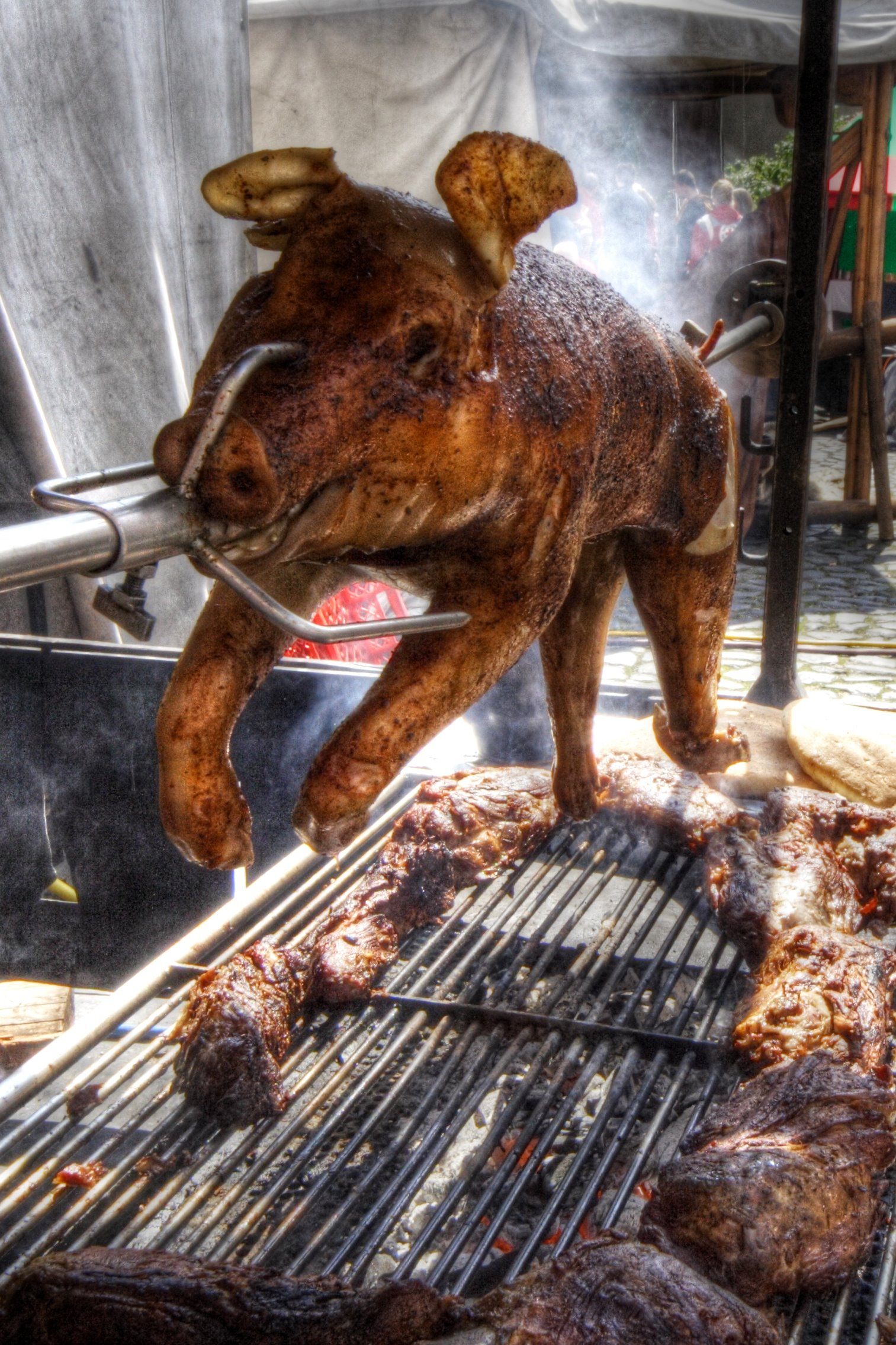
Spanferkel, German cuisine

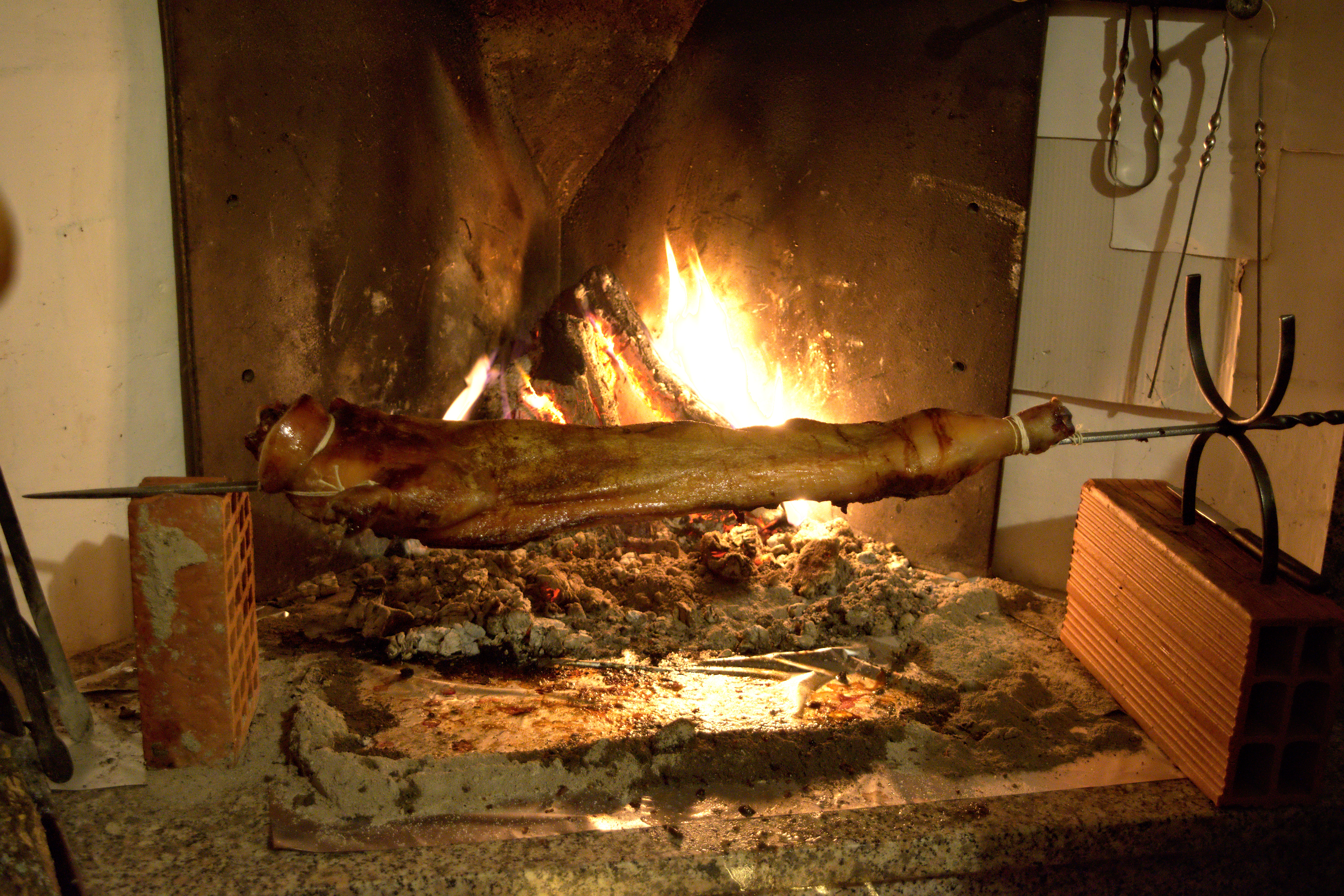
Porceddu, Sardinian cuisine

=== Spain, Portugal and former colonies ===
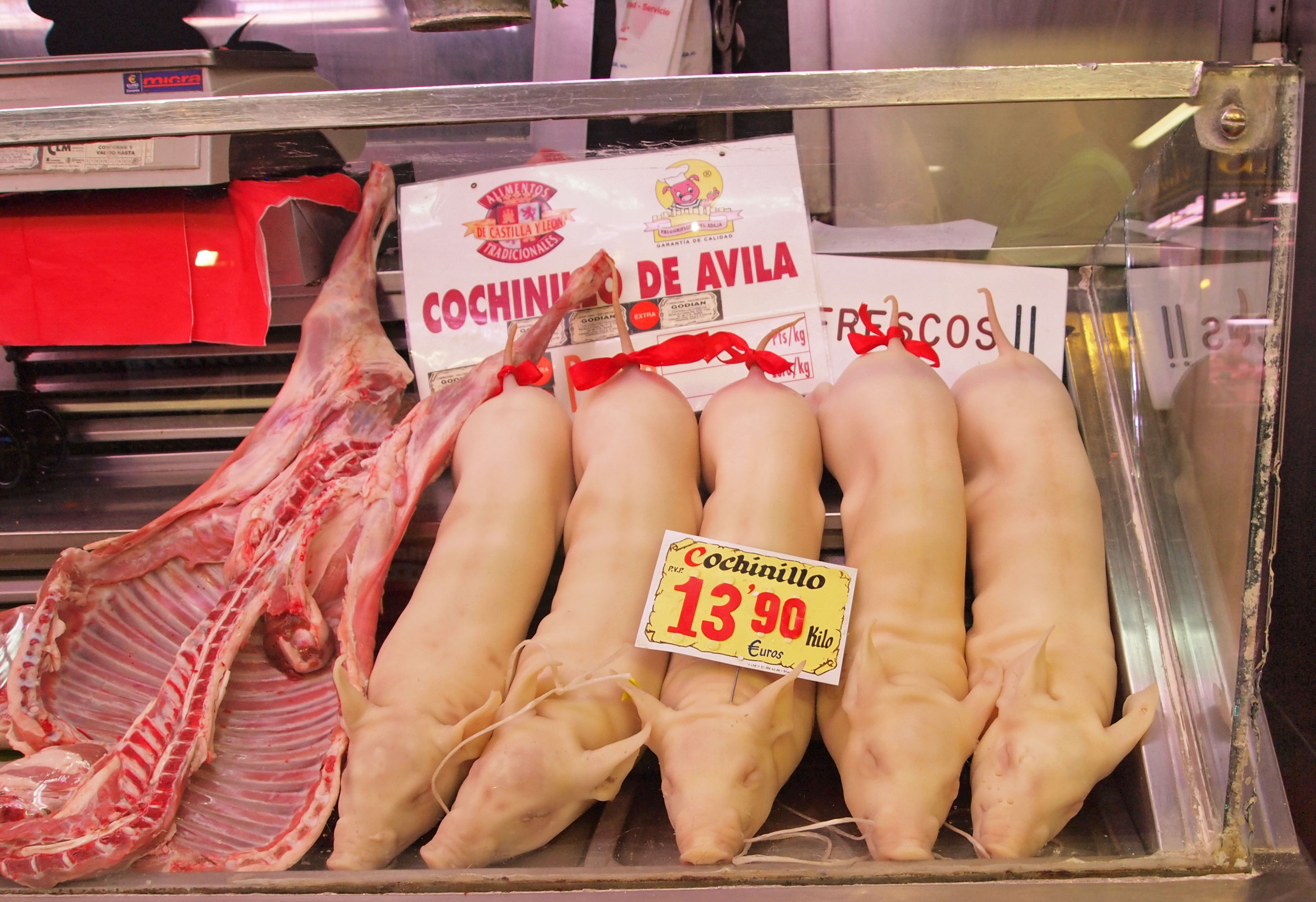
Cochinillo at a Madrid butchers

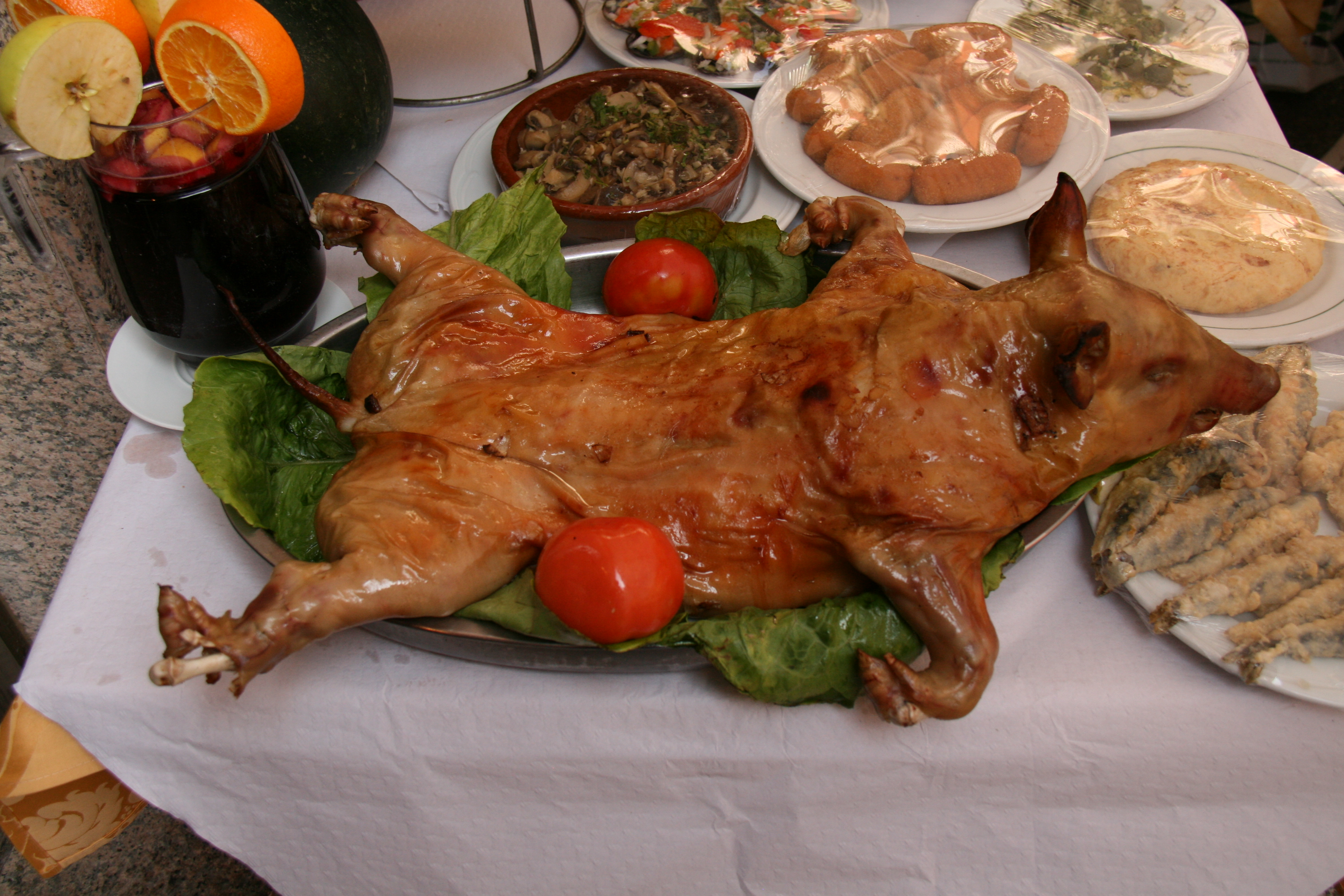
Spanish cochinillo asado

Lechón (Spanish, Spanish pronunciation: [leˈtʃon]; from leche "milk" + -ón), cochinillo asado (Spanish, literally "sucking pig"), (Note: The Larousse English-Spanish, Spanish-English dictionary gives two definitions of lechon: "!. [animal] sucking pig. 2. fig [persona] pig, slob".) or leitão (Portuguese; from leite "milk" + -ão) is a pork dish in several regions of the world, most specifically in Spain (in particular Segovia), Portugal (in particular Bairrada) and regions worldwide previously colonized by the Portuguese Empire or Spanish Empire. Lechón/Leitão is a word referring to a roasted baby pig (piglet) which was still fed by sucking its mother's milk. Lechón/Leitão is a popular item in the cuisine in Los Angeles (in the United States), Spain, Cuba, Puerto Rico, Honduras, Argentina, Uruguay, Bolivia, Ecuador, Peru, Costa Rica, the Dominican Republic, the Philippines and other former Spanish colonies, as well as in Portugal, Cape Verde, Angola, Mozambique and other former Portuguese colonies. The dish features a whole roasted suckling pig cooked over charcoal. It has been described as a national dish of Cuba, the Philippines, Portugal, Puerto Rico, and Spain.

In most of these regions, lechón/leitão is prepared throughout the year for special occasions, during festivals. It is also the centerpiece of the traditional Christmas Eve dinner (Noche Buena) in Cuba, and the Philippines.

==== Colombia ====
Lechona, also known as lechón asado, is a popular Colombian dish. It is similar in style to many preparations made in other South American countries, consisting of a roasted pig stuffed with yellow peas, green onion, and spices, cooked in an outdoor brick oven for several hours. Yellow rice is sometimes added, especially in Bogotá. It is mostly traditional to the Tolima Department in central Colombia and is usually accompanied by arepas, a corn-based dough.

==== Philippines ====
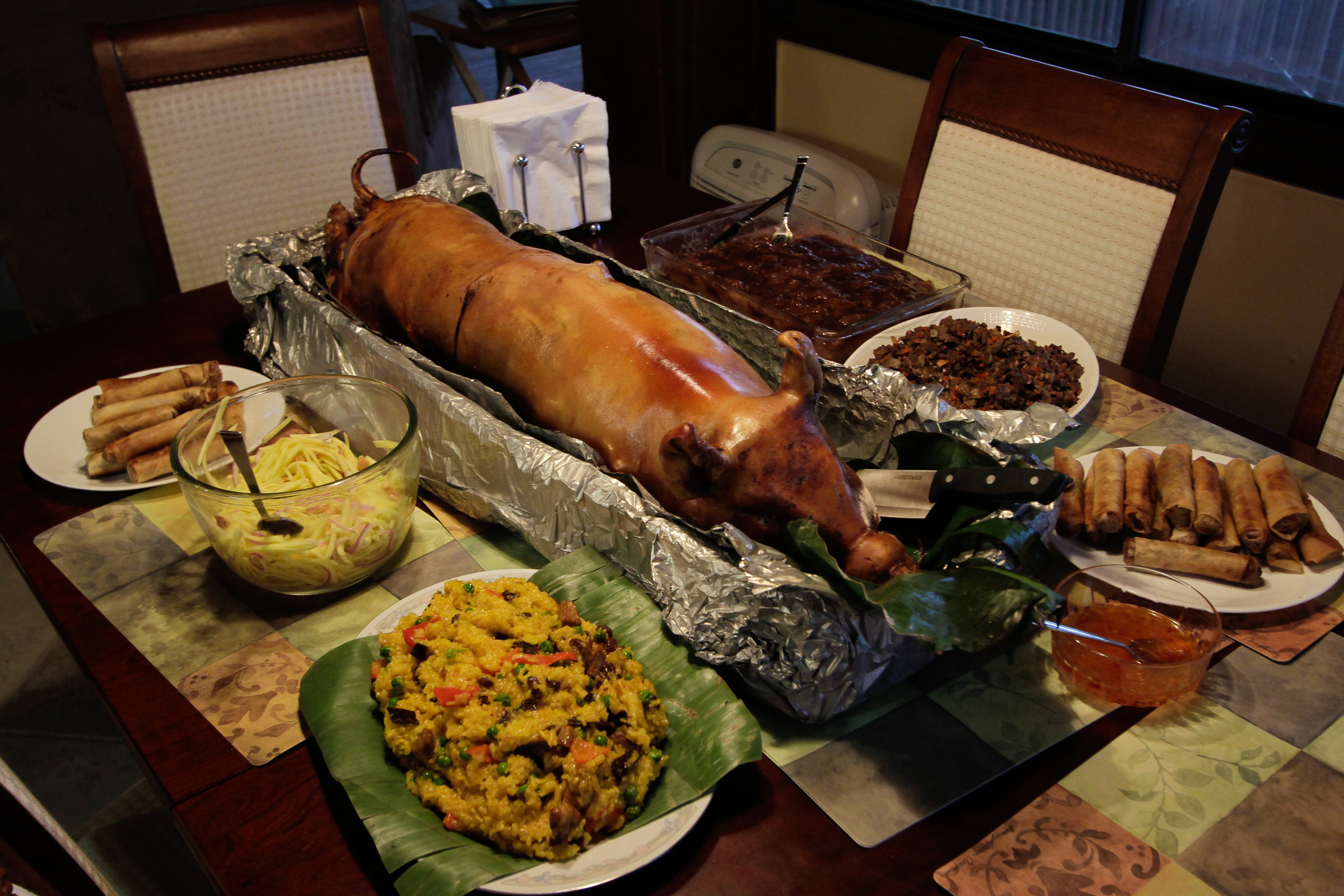
Filipino lechon (inihaw na baboy) in a traditional Filipino noche buena (Christmas Eve) dinner. Unlike the Hispanic lechón, it uses weaned pigs and is pre-colonial in origin.

The pig-roasting traditions of the Philippines (similar to other Austronesian regions) have native pre-colonial origins and is cooked with native methods and ingredients. Native ingredients unique to the Filipino lechón include stuffing like lemongrass, batuan fruits, and citrus or tamarind leaves. The meaning of "lechón" in Filipino has diverged from the original Spanish to become an umbrella term for "roasted pig" and spit-roasted dishes in general (otherwise known as inihaw or inasal). It is used more commonly for weaned or adult roasted pigs rather than to suckling pigs, with Cebu being asserted by American chef Anthony Bourdain as having the best pigs. When suckling pigs are used in Filipino cuisine, it is known by the redundant name lechón de leche and roasted in native style. The Spanish-introduced lechón is differentiated under the name cochinillo (spelled kotsinilyo in Filipino) or lechóng-biík (literally "piglet lechón").

==== Puerto Rico ====
The dish has been described as a national dish of Puerto Rico. The name of the dish in Puerto Rico is lechón asado. (Note: Other dishes have also been described as a national dish of Puerto Rico, such as: asopao and arroz con gandules.)

=== East Asia ===
Suckling pig dishes in parts of Southeast Asia, like Singapore and Vietnam, are influenced by ethnic Chinese cuisine. Roast suckling pig is eaten in Chinese or Vietnamese restaurants for important parties. It is also a popular dish at wedding dinners or a party for a baby's completion of its first month of life.

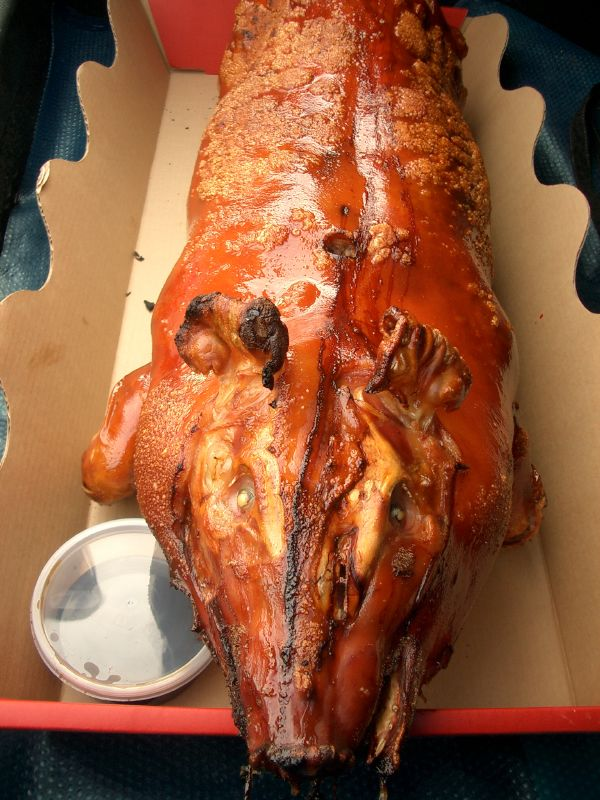
Cantonese-style

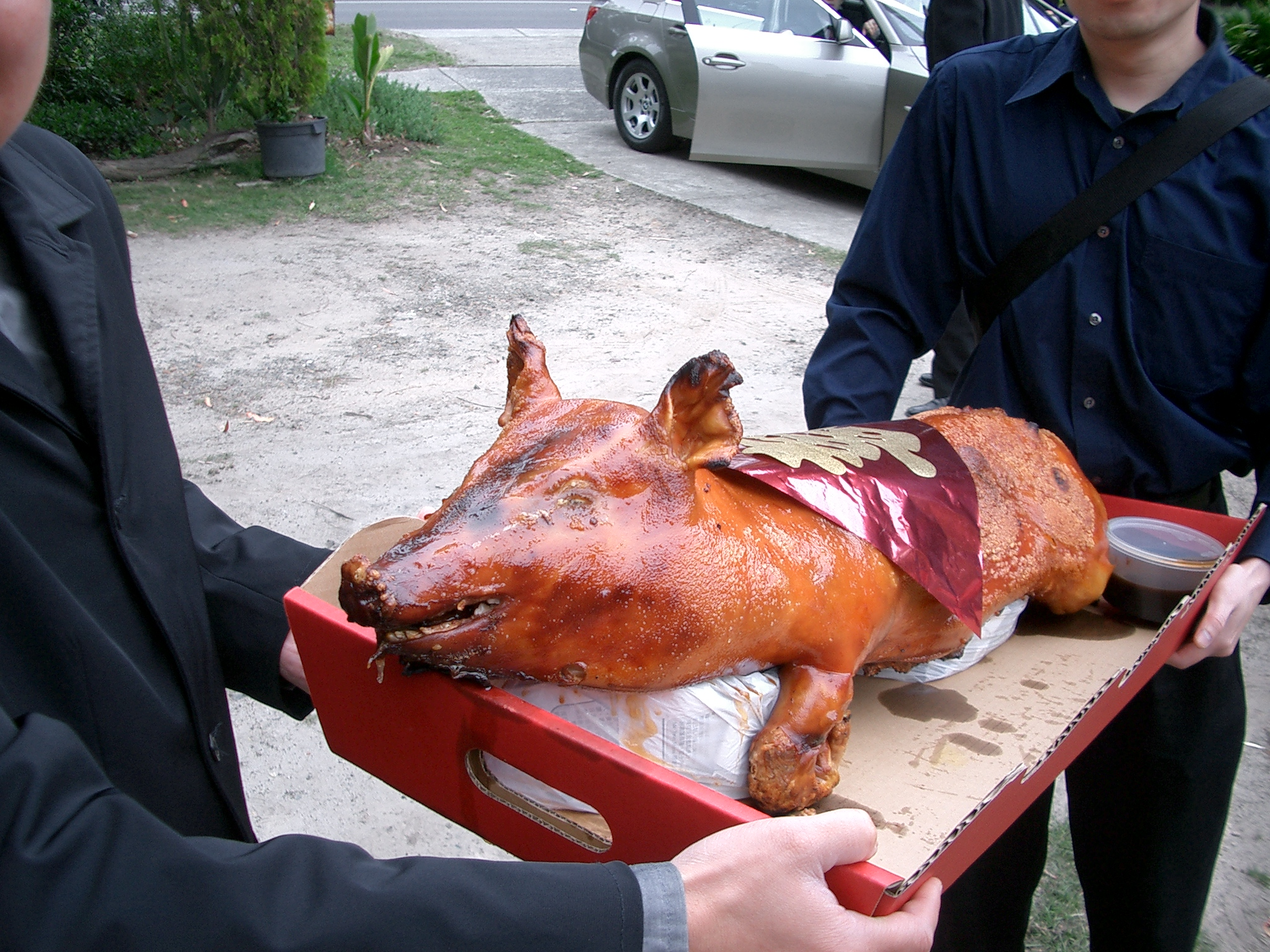
Bearing 囍 (Double Happiness) placard at a Cantonese wedding

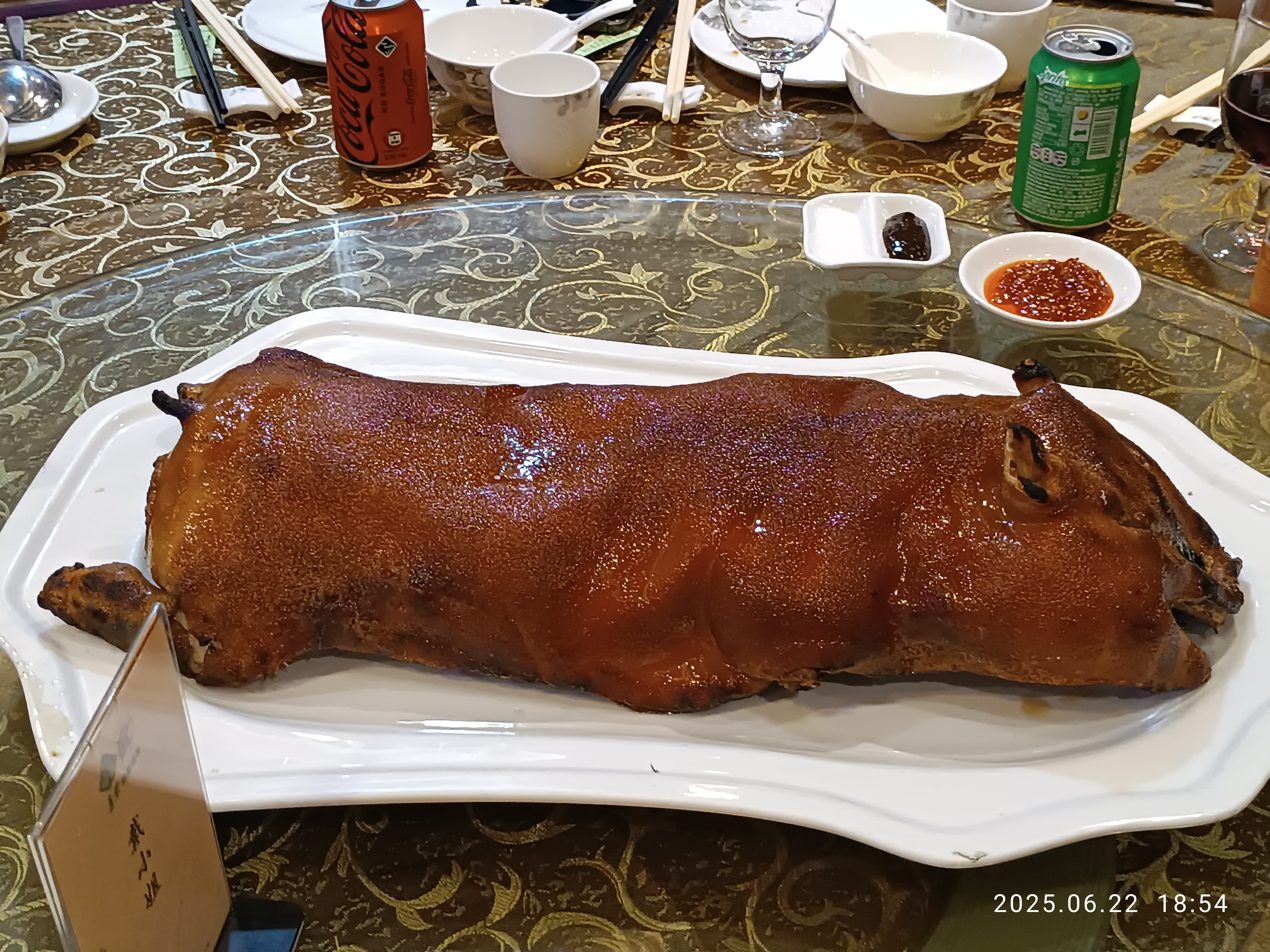
At a Hong Kong restaurant

=== United States ===
The suckling pig is used in Cajun cuisine in the southern US, where the Cochon de Lait Festival is held annually in the small town of Mansura, Louisiana. During this festival suckling pigs are served.

== See also ==
- Asado
- Eisbein
- Fetal pig
- Roasted pig
- Kalua

- List of barbecue dishes
- List of spit-roasted foods
- Lechon kawali
- Lechon manok

- Inihaw
- Pavochon
- Pig pickin'
- Siu yuk

== Notes, references and sources ==
=== Sources ===
- Adam, Hans Karl (1970). The International Wine and Food Society's Guide to German Cookery. Newton Abbot: David and Charles. ISBN 978-0-7153-4809-3. OCLC 1393054000.
- Apicius, Caelius (1969). M. E. Milham (ed.). De re coquinaria (in Latin). Leipzig: BG Teubner Publishing. OCLC 1148816741.
- Ayto, John (2012) [1990]. The Diner's Dictionary: Word Origins of Food & Drink. Oxford: Oxford University Press. ISBN 978-0-19-174443-3.
- Beeton, Isabella (1861). The Book of Household Management. London: S. O. Beeton. OCLC 1045333327.
- Bianconi, Emanuela (2016). "Risotti chicchi di bontà". I Quaderni di Alice Cucina (in Italian). Guidonia Montecelio: Alma Media.
- Bickel, Walter (1989). Hering's Dictionary of Classical and Modern Cookery (eleventh ed.). London: Virtue. ISBN 978-3-8057-0307-9.
- Brisse, Léon (1884). 366 Menus and 1200 Recipes of the Baron Brisse in French and English. London: Samson Low. OCLC 1040558994.
- Crewe, Quentin (1980). Quentin Crewe's International Pocket Food Book. London: Mitchell Beazley. ISBN 978-0-85-533210-5.
- Dalby, Andrew (1997). Siren Feasts: A History of Food and Gastronomy in Greece. London and New York: Routledge. ISBN 978-0-41-511620-6.
- David, Elizabeth (2008) [1960]. French Provincial Cooking. London: Folio Society. OCLC 809349711.
- Davidson, Alan (1999). The Oxford Companion to Food. Oxford: Oxford University Press. ISBN 978-0-19-211579-9.
- Deutsch, Jonathan; Megan J. Elias (2014). Barbecue: A Global History. London: Reaktion Books. ISBN 978-1-78023-298-0.
- Escoffier, Auguste (1907). A Guide to Modern Cookery. London: Heinemann. OCLC 560604921.
- Fodor, Helen; Della de Kovach (1931). The Best Hungarian Dishes. Budapest: George Vajna. OCLC 561219165.
- Gilissen, John; Frits Gorlé (1989). Historische inleiding tot het recht, Volume 1 (in Dutch). Antwerp: Kluwer. ISBN 978-90-6321-654-2.
- Mason, Laura (1999). "Sucking pig". The Oxford Companion to Food. Oxford: Oxford University Press. ISBN 978-0-19-211579-9.
- Montagné, Prosper (1976). Larousse gastronomique. London: Hamlyn. OCLC 1285641881.
- Moragas, Elvira de, ed. (1996). Diccionario Español–Inglés Inglés–Español. Paris: Larousse. ISBN 2-03-451338-X.
- Östman, Elisabeth (1911). Iduns kokbok. Stockholm: Hökerberg. OCLC 39026807.
- Petit, A. (1860). La gastronomie en Russie (in French). Paris: Émile Mellier. OCLC 1063518479.
- Pininska, Mary (1991). The Polish Kitchen. London: Papermac. ISBN 978-0-33-356871-2.
- Renfrew, Jane (1985). Food and Cooking in Roman Britain: History and Recipes. London: English Heritage. ISBN 978-1-85-074534-1.
- Riley, Gillian (2009) [2007]. The Oxford Companion to Italian Food. Oxford: Oxford University Press. ISBN 978-0-19-860617-8..
- Saulnier, Louis (1978) [1923]. Le répertoire de la cuisine (fourteenth ed.). London: Jaeggi. OCLC 1086737491.
- Scheibenpflug, Lotte (1999). Specialities of Austrian Cooking. Innsbruck: Pinguin-Verlag. ISBN 978-3-70-162456-0.
