= Cochinillo asado =

Spanish pork dish

Tostón asado or cochinillo asado is a dish consisting of roast suckling pig. It is commonly used in the Spanish cuisine of Castile, with the variants of Arévalo and Segovia being the most popular ones, although also popular in Madrid and some places in the regions of La Mancha and Aragón. This oven dish is traditionally prepared in an earthenware pot and served hot with a crispy crust. It is recommended to combine cochinillo asado with wine.

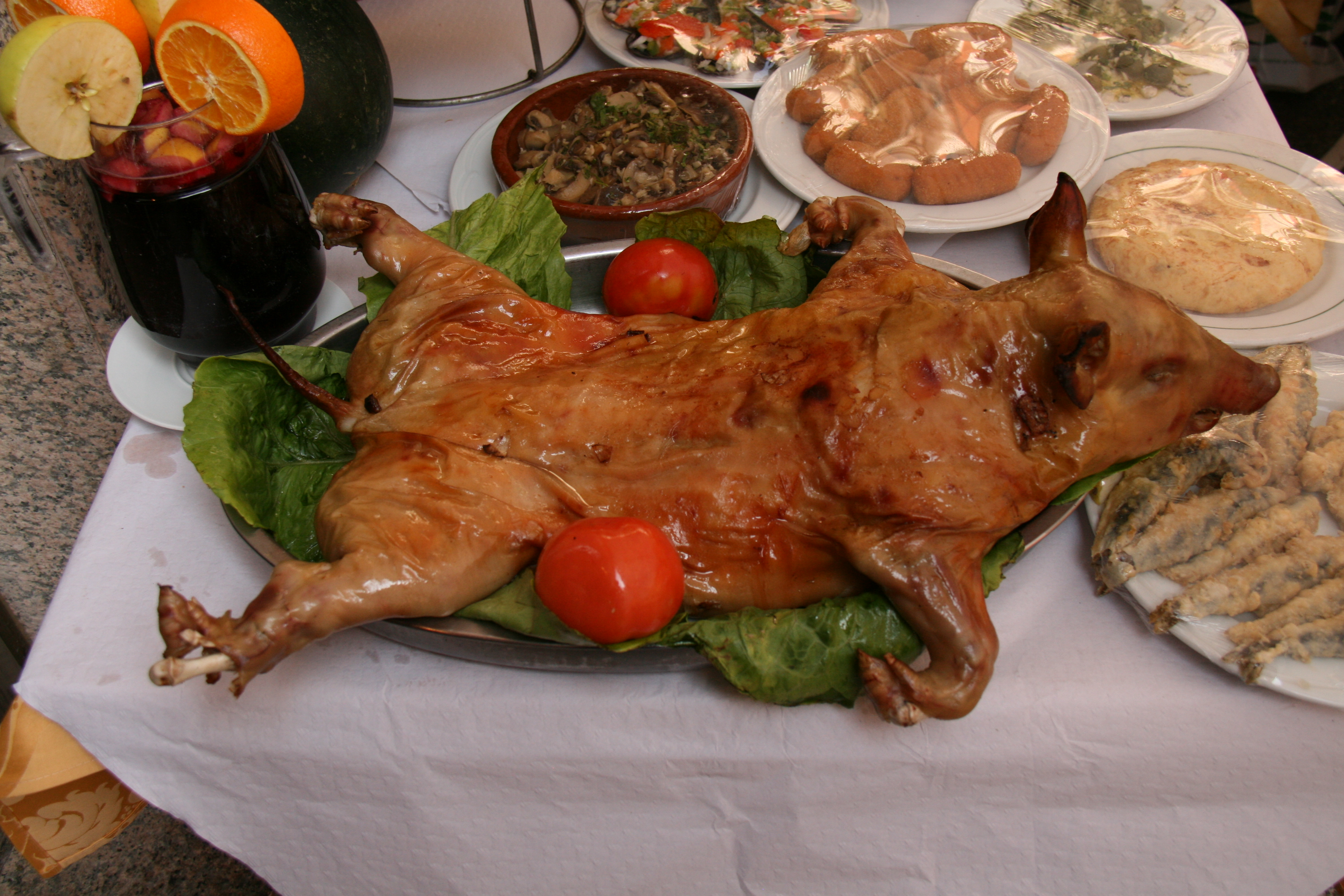
Cochinillo asado

== History ==
Tostón asado, just like roast lamb, forms part of the Castilian cuisine since the Roman conquest of Hispania. There are no recipes and descriptions available of the pre-Celtiberian period. In the 17th century, cochinillo asado became popular at bars and soup kitchens across the region of Castile. Little by little, it was served to travellers who were heading to Madrid. Yet in the middle of the 20th century, several taverns and restaurants in Segovia and Madrid claimed to have the best recipe in an attempt to attract tourists. Cándido is one of the most popular taverns, and the innkeeper became famous in the middle of the 20th century for accompanying the piglet dishes with songs. This ceremony gained international fame.

== Preparation ==
Many markets and butcher shops in Spain offer cochinillo asado. According to some recipes, the piglet needs to be entirely cleaned, but without removing the kidneys. There are many different ways to prepare tostón asado, with the same applying for chopping up the piglet. The preparation process includes cutting the piglet's stomach, as well as the backbone's center, followed by cleaning the interior part.The piglet is typically coated in batter, combined with pork fat and a few bay leaves and twigs, then cooked in an earthenware pot in the oven. In other regions, they use white wine during the process to ensure the meat's tenderness. Tostón asado is usually served in the same earthenware pot. It is also possible to marinate the meat parts for several days and dehydrate them on the day of the roasting process. A wood-fired oven is traditionally used to roast piglets. Wine is one of the most widely accepted drinks to complement roast suckling pigs, according to gastronomic literature. Normally, it is served with special decorations, with an apple on top of the piglet's mouth being one of the most common forms.
