= Guatemalan cuisine =

Culinary tradition

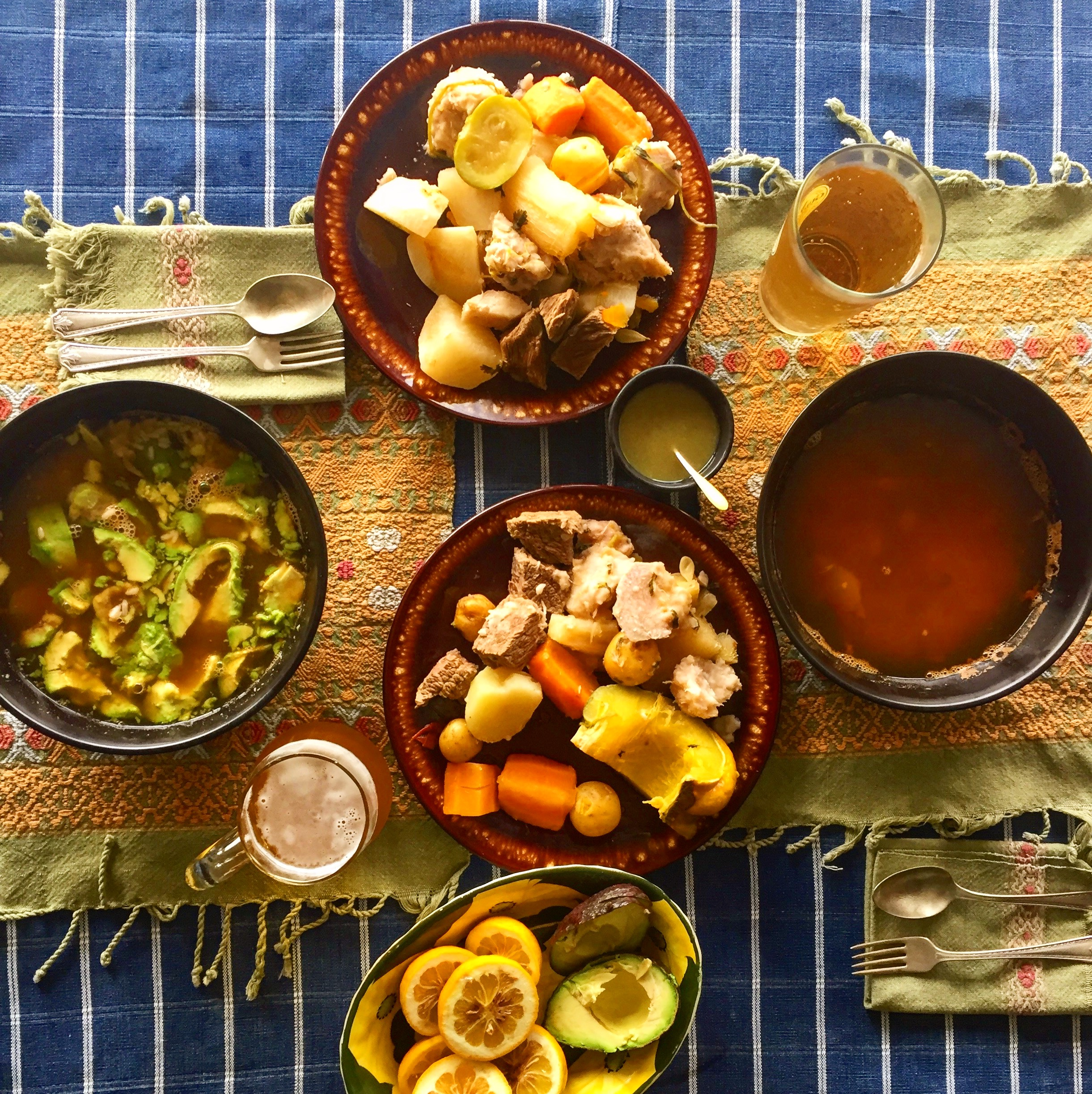
Caldo de res, or beef soup

Most traditional foods in Guatemalan cuisine are based on Maya cuisine, with Spanish influence, and prominently feature corn, chilies and beans as key ingredients.

There are also foods that are commonly eaten on certain days of the week. For example, it is a popular custom to eat paches (a kind of tamale made from potatoes) on Thursday. Certain dishes are also associated with special occasions, such as fiambre for All Saints Day on November 1 and tamales, which are common around Christmas.

== History ==
=== Pre-classic and classic periods ===
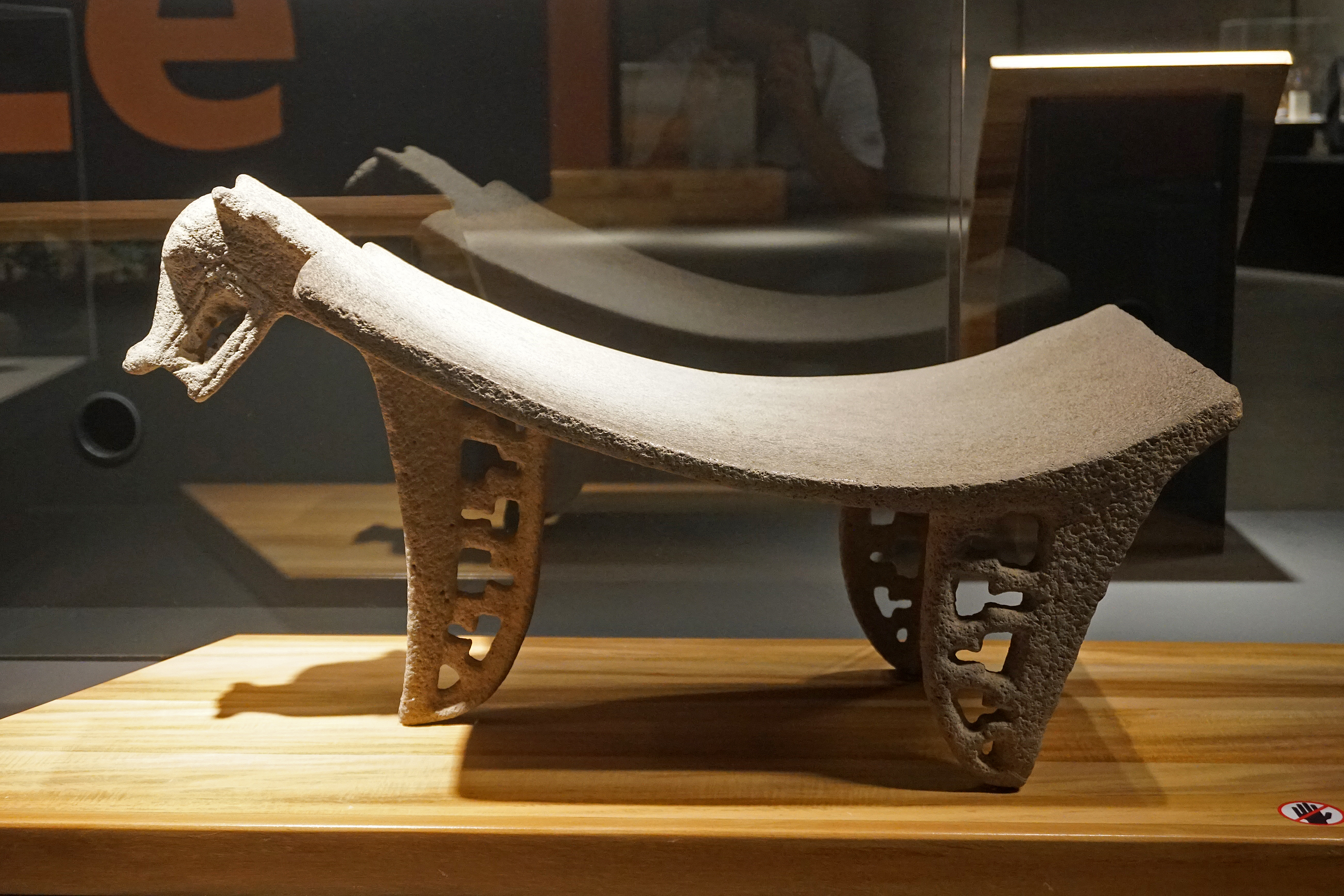
Volcanic stone metate traditionally used to grind maize

In the early pre-classic period (2000 BC - 250 AD), agricultural techniques such as the slash-and-burn method began to develop as Maya settled into permanent villages. During this time, Maya cultivated maize, beans, squash and chilli peppers. Local game included deer, rabbit, quail, duck, peccary, turkey and reptiles. During the classic period (250 AD - 900AD), maize became a staple in the Maya diet. Before maize was consumed, it was processed in a technique called nixtamalization, involving cooking the corn with minerals, usually slaked lime (calcium hydroxide), giving the maize a higher nutritional value. After this process, the cooked maize would be ground into masa using a metate.

=== Colonial period ===
With the arrival of Spanish conquistadors to the New World, they brought with them foods that were common in the Old World but new to the Americas. These included wheat, barley, legumes, bananas, sugarcane, olive oil, coffee and dairy. After his first voyage, Christopher Columbus noted the need of livestock in the New World. On his second voyage, he brought horses, pigs, chickens, cattle and sheep. Spanish conquistadors also introduced new cooking methods such as frying, oven baking and sun-drying techniques.

This fusion of indigenous Maya ingredients and Old World culinary techniques gave rise to Guatemala's traditional stews (known locally as recados). In 2007, the Ministry of Culture and Sports officially declared four iconic traditional Guatemalan dishes — Pepián, Jocón, Kaq'ik, and Mole de Plátano—as Intangible Cultural Heritage of the Nation, recognizing their historical significance as enduring symbols of the country's cultural syncretism.

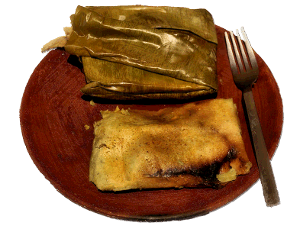
Tamales are a traditional food eaten in Guatemala on special occasions, especially during Christmastime and around other holidays. They are pouches of masa usually filled with meat, such as pork and chicken, but sometimes filled with vegetables such as maize and potatoes, and are usually wrapped in banana leaves.

== Style ==
Many Guatemalan dishes are cooked without the use of cooking oil, with ingredients placed directly on the comal or wrapped in leaves. Many Guatemalan dishes have the suffix '-ik' as part of their name; -ik means chili in several Mayan languages spoken in the country.

=== Varieties of Guatemalan tamales ===
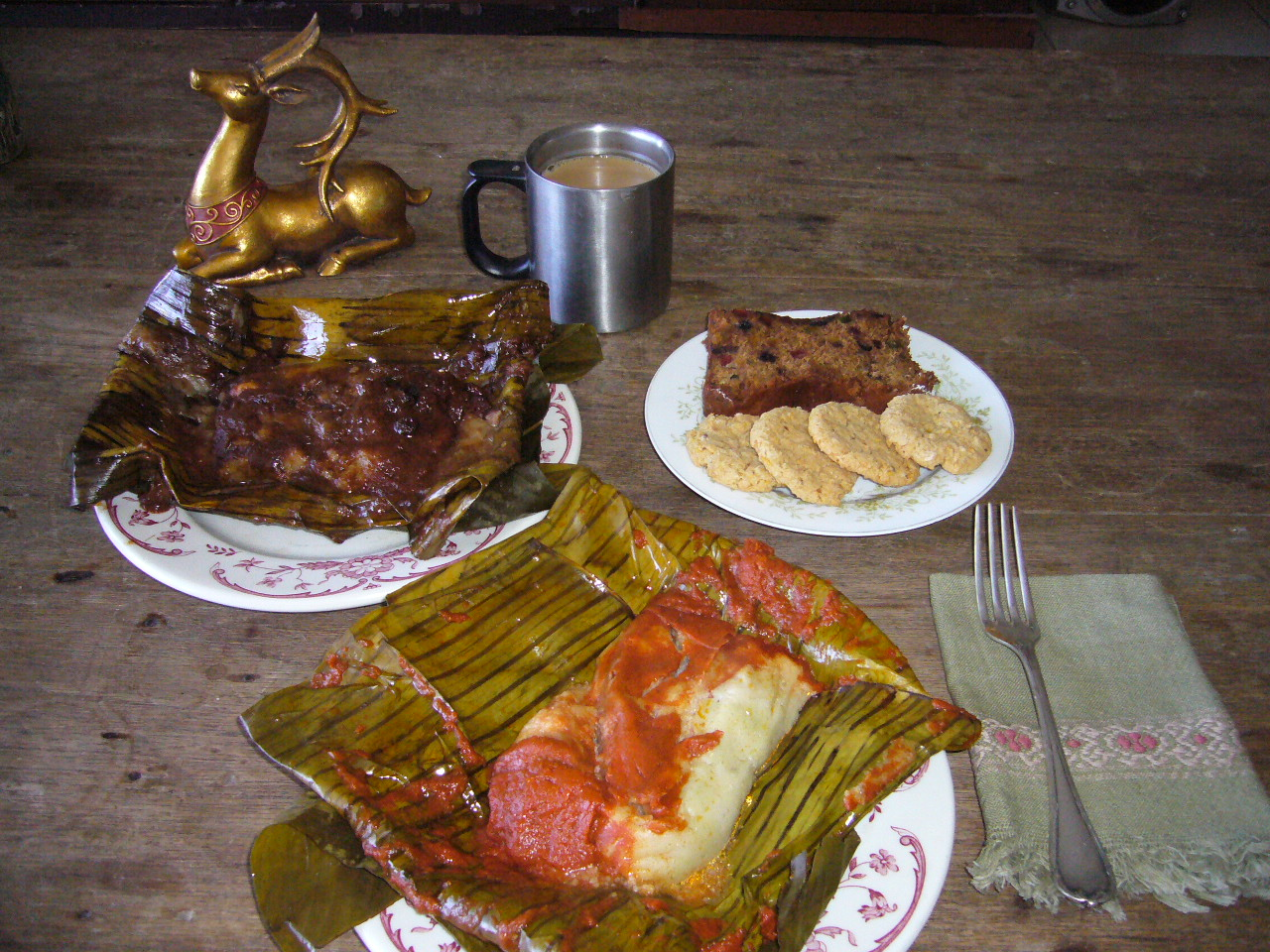
Black and red tamales in Guatemala

There are reportedly hundreds of varieties of tamales throughout Guatemala. The key variations include the ingredients in the masa or dough (corn, potatoes, rice), in the filling (meat, fruits, nuts), and the wrapping with (leaves, husks). Tamales in Guatemala tend to be wrapped in green maxan leaves (Calathea lutea), while chuchitos, which resemble Mexican tamales, are wrapped in corn husks.

The masa is made out of corn that is not sweet, comparable to what is known as feed corn in the United States. In Guatemala, this non-sweet corn is called maize and the corn that Americans are used to eating on the cob (sweet corn), Guatemalans call elote. Tamales in Guatemala are more typically wrapped in plantain or banana leaves and maxan leaves than corn husks. Additionally, Guatemalan tamales use cooked masa, which is prepared in a time-consuming process.

- Tamales colorados ("red tamales") owe their name to the tomato and achiote (annatto seed) that give them their color. They are wrapped with corn masa and are stuffed with tomato recado (a flavorful thick sauce), roasted red bell pepper strips, capers, green olives, and chicken, beef or pork.
- Tamales negros ("black tamales") are darker and sweeter than their red counterparts due to the chocolate, raisins, prunes and almonds which are added to them. Other black tamales are not sweet but are simply made out of blue or black corn.
- Tamales de elote ("sweet corn tamales") do not use the typical masa but instead are made of sweet corn. These may contain whole kernels of corn in the masa and do not generally contain meat.
- Chuchitos ("small dogs") are a typical kind of Guatemalan tamale made using the same masa as a regular tamale, but they are smaller, have a much firmer consistency, and are wrapped in a tuzas (dried corn husks) instead of plantain leaves. Chuchitos are often accompanied by a simple tomato salsa and sprinkled with a hard, salty white cheese traditional from the Zacapa region. Chuchitos are a commonly served at luncheons, dinners and celebrations. The masa can be mixed with tomato recado or with a meat broth.
- Tamalitos de masa ("small dough tamales") are smaller than the typical tamales because they are usually plain in taste, with no filling and are used to dip in other foods such as soup, salsa or beans, rather than eaten alone. These tamales are a staple of western Guatemalan cuisine which are favored over the typical tortilla.
- Tamalitos de chipilín and tamales de loroco are other variants of tamales de masa with different ingredients added to the mix.
- Paches are a kind of tamal made from potatoes instead of corn.
- Bollito are similar to tamales, but filled with beans instead of meat.

== List of typical foods ==
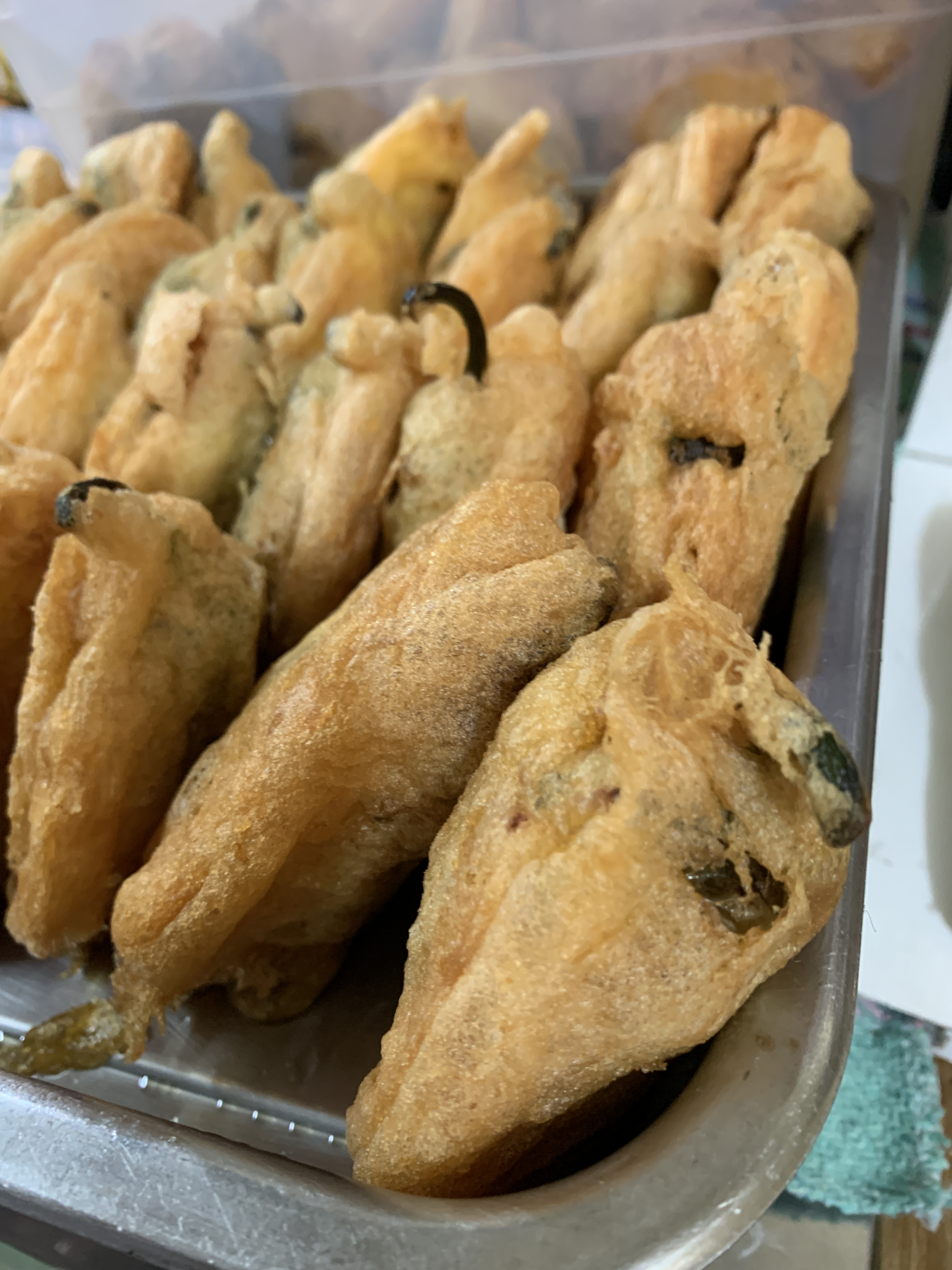
Guatemalan chiles rellenos

=== Main dishes ===
- Tapado, seafood soup with green plantain and coconut milk
- Chiles rellenos, a blend of shredded meats and peppers, covered in egg batter and fried
- Gallo en perro, spicy stew ("perro" being slang for "hot" or "spicy")
- Gallo en chicha, hen/chicken stew
- Garnachas
- Pepián (19th-century recipe), meat and vegetable stew in a thick recado sauce
- Kak'ik, turkey soup with chili
- Caldo de res or cocido, beef and vegetable soup
- Caldo de gallina, hen soup
- Jocón, chicken stewed in a green sauce
- Hilachas, shredded beef in a red sauce
- Güicoyitos rellenos, stuffed zucchini
- Pollo a la cerveza, chicken in a beer sauce
- Pollo guisado, Spanish chicken stew
- Carne guisada, meat stew
- Chuletas fascinante, "fascinating chops", a breaded pan-fried pork chop
- Ensalada en escabeche, pickled vegetable salad
- Pollo encebollado, chicken in an onion-based sauce
- Estofado, beef, potato and carrot stew
- Revolcado (or "chanfaina"), tomato-based stew with spices and cow's underbelly
- Pollo en crema, chicken in cream-based sauce
- Carne adobada, adobo marinated preserved beef or pork
- Pulique, yet another kind of meat and vegetable stew
- Suban-ik, chicken and pork stewed in a red sauce inside mashan leaves, often prepared for special occasions
- Enchiladas, tostadas (fried flat corn tortillas) topped with a lettuce leaf, meat (either ground beef, shredded chicken, or pork), vegetables, and hard boiled egg slices

=== Rice dishes ===
There are a variety of rice dishes made in Guatemala. Some include:

- Arroz frito, fried rice
- Arroz amarillo, plain yellow rice
- Arroz con vegetales, rice made with different vegetables like corn, carrots and peas
- Arroz con frijoles, called simply that or in other parts called "casamiento" or "casado", rice with beans (typically black beans)
- Rice and beans, made with coconut milk
- Arroz con pollo, chicken and rice, similar to paella

=== Desserts ===
- Pastel de banano, a type of banana cake
- Tortitas de yuca, a thick yuca pancake
- Chancletas de güisquil, sweet chayote covered in whipped egg whites and then fried
- Arroz con leche, a rice pudding
- Atol de elote, sweet corn atole
- Buñuelos, torrejas y molletes, different kinds of sweet bread soaked in syrup, which may or may not have a filling
- Rellenitos de plátano, small balls of mashed plantains filled with sweetened black beans, fried and sprinkled with sugar
- Garbanzos en dulce, chickpeas in a sweet, thick syrup
- Repollitos con dulce de leche
- Mole de platano, fried plantain slices in a chocolate-based sauce made with several chilies

=== Snacks ===
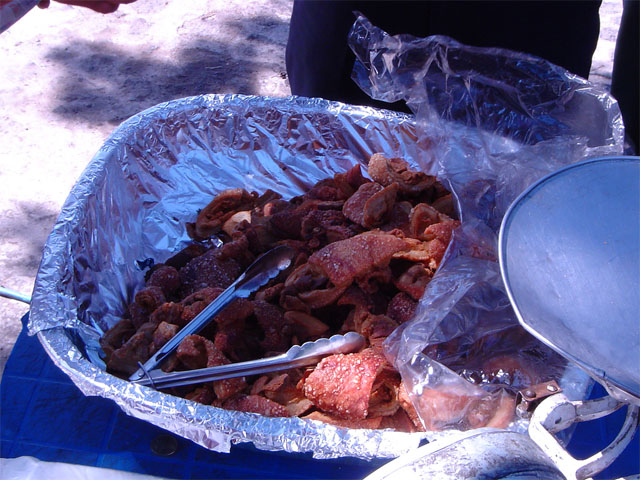
Chicharrones in Guatemala

- Tamales de frijol con chiltepe
- Shucos ("dirties"), the Guatemalan version of a hot dog, which often includes guacamole, cabbage, and mayonnaise. This type of hot dog is a native snack only from Guatemala City where it was created.
- Chicharrones y carnitas, fried pork skins and fried pork meat chunks, respectively
- Tostadas de guacamol, frijol, o salsa, fried corn tortilla with guacamole, fried black beans or tomato sauce
- Tacos de carne o pollo, fried rolled-up corn tortillas filled with meat or chicken
- Yuca con chicharrón, boiled cassava served with fried pork chunks

=== Traditional food for Día de todos los Santos (November 1) ===
- Fiambre, which can be "white" or "red", depending on whether the pickled vegetable salad in it contains beets
- Ayote en dulce, a type of squash boiled in a special sweet syrup
- Jocotes en miel, a variety of Spondias purpurea fruit boiled in syrup
- Empanadas de ayote, a type of squash pastry

=== Other ===
- Atol maatz, thick corn-based drink flavored with fire ash
- Caldo de huevos, an egg-based consomme typically eaten as a remedy for hangovers
- Chirmol Chapín
- Chojín, a version of salpicón made with fried pork skins
- Guatemalan ceviche of fish, shrimp, snail, clams or a mixture of all
- Macuy, a green-colored soup
- Puchon-ik, chili-spiced dried fish popular in the city of San Juan
- Salpicón, chopped meat, radish and mint leaves served with lemon juice
- Tukun-ik, a corn, egg, and chili soup popular in San Juan

== See also ==
- Latin American cuisine
- Indigenous cuisine of the Americas
