= Chicharrón en salsa =

Mexican dish made from pork rinds

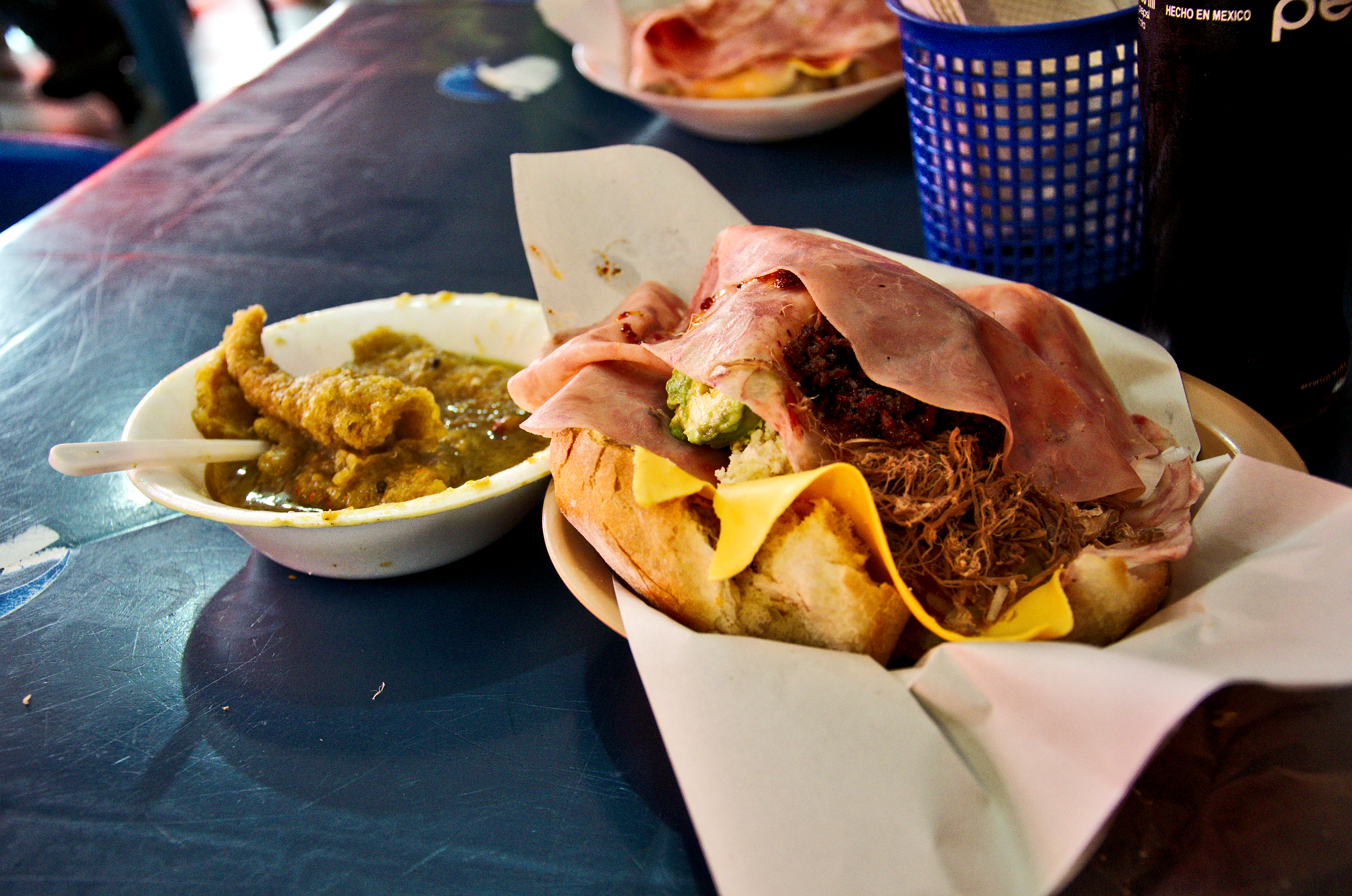
Chicharrónnes en salsa verde (on left), accompanied with a torta (sandwich)

Chicharrón en salsa is a popular Mexican breakfast or lunch dish made from chicharrónnes (pork rinds) cooked in a mild sauce and seasoned with cilantro. It is often accompanied by refried beans and corn tortillas. There are two versions: chicharrónnes en salsa verde (green sauce), and chicharrónnes en salsa roja (red sauce).
