= Pepián =

Guatemalan meat stew

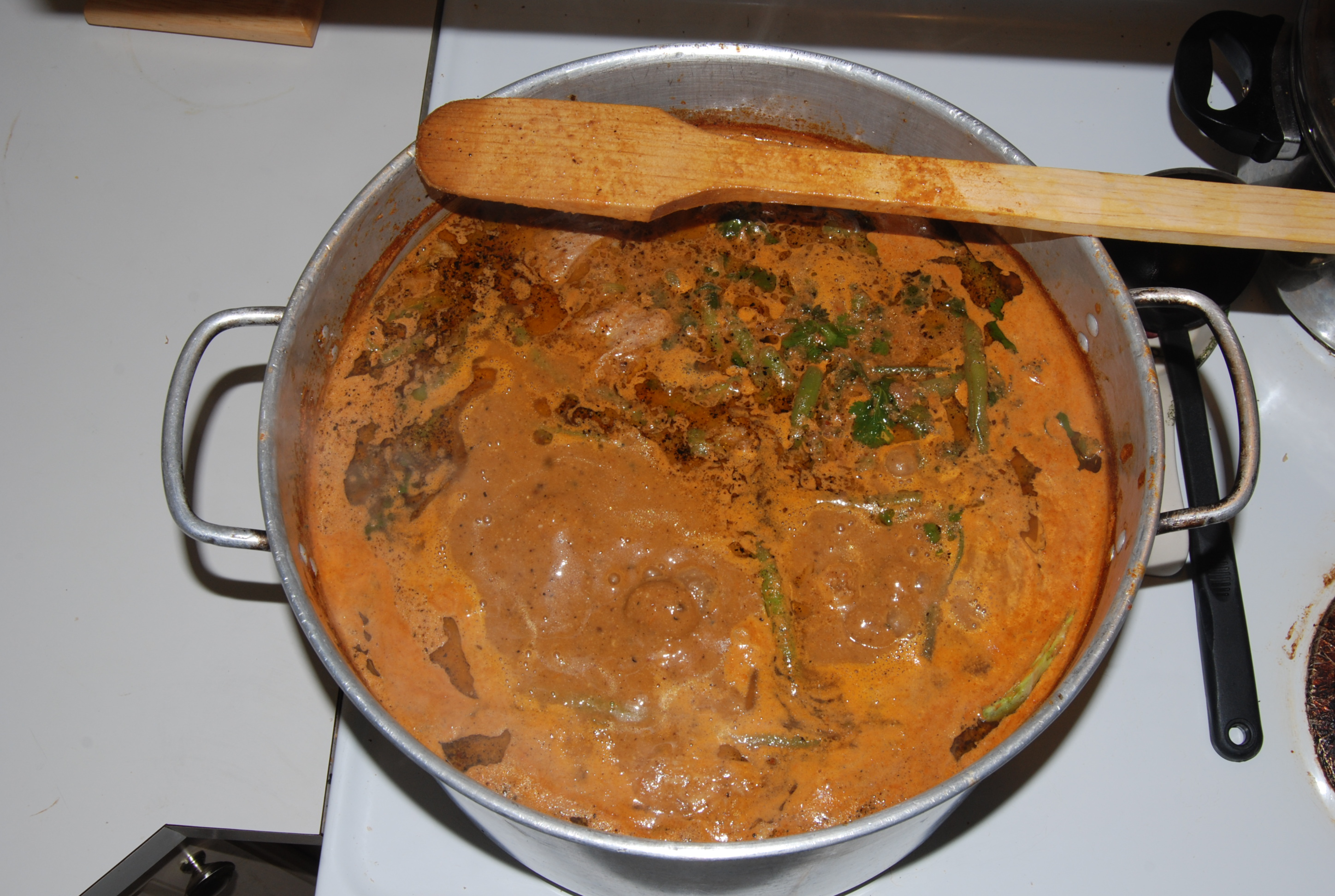
- Pepián
- Place of origin: Guatemala
- Main ingredients: Meat

Pepián is a thick meat stew from Guatemala. It is one of the oldest and most recognizable dishes of Guatemalan cuisine having as its origin the influences from Guatemala's colonial past and the indigenous cuisine. The meat-based stew, thickened with gourd seeds, can be made with beef or chicken (beef is more common in urban centers). Traditional recipes include tomatillo, tomato and hot chili. Guatemalan restaurants in the United States usually consider the dish to be of Maya origin. It is a popular street food in Guatemalan cities.

In Guatemala, it is considered a national dish. Pipián is a similar dish from Mexican cuisine.

== See also ==
- List of stews
