= Hilachas =

Guatemalan beef dish

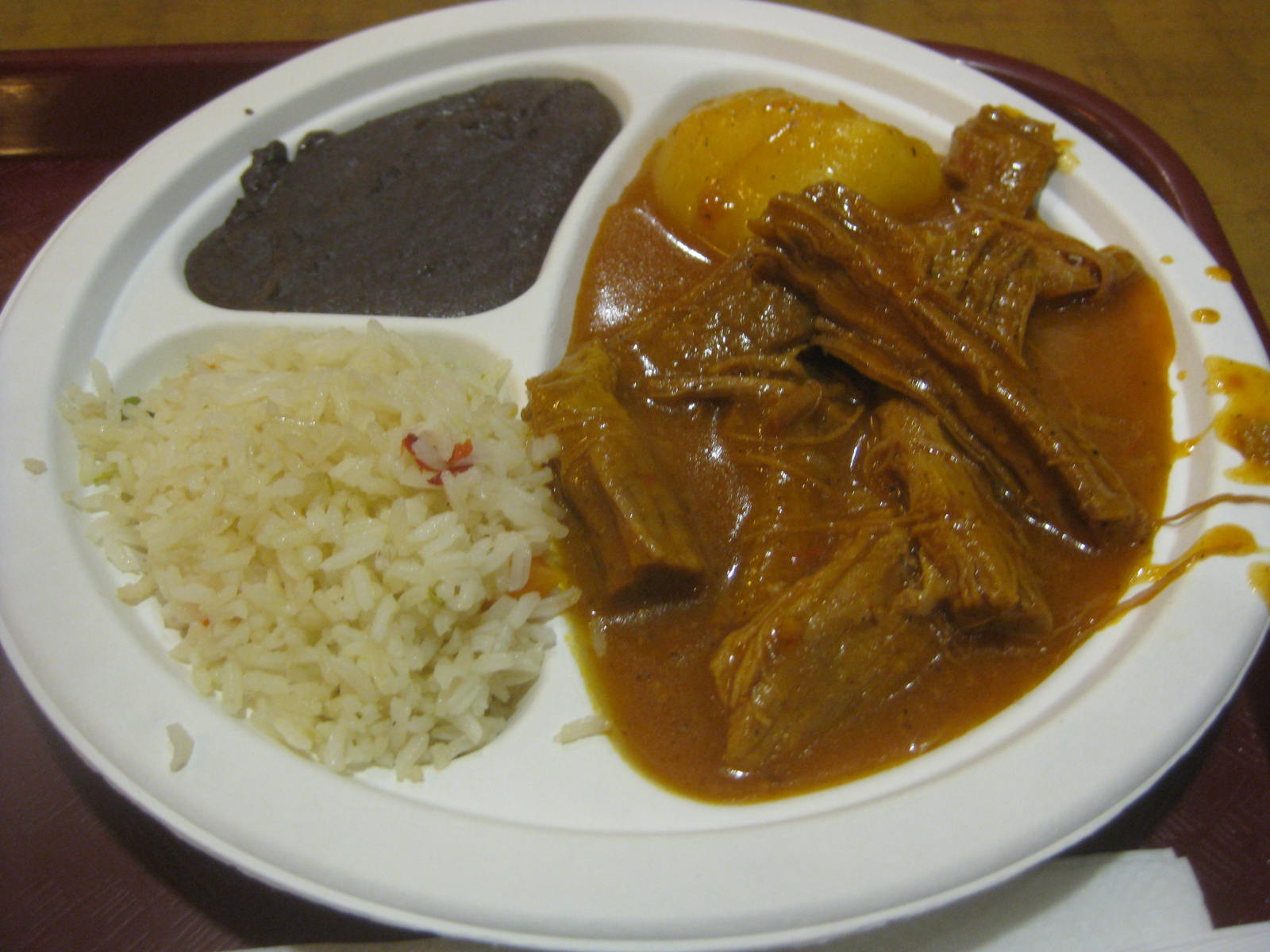
Hilachas served with rice and black beans

Hilachas is a dish originating in Guatemalan cuisine that is similar to ropa vieja. It generally consists of boiled, shredded beef served with tomato sauce and tomatillo, potatoes, carrots and Guajillo chiles. The name translates to "rags" and is very common throughout Central America.
