= Mogolla =

Bread from Colombia

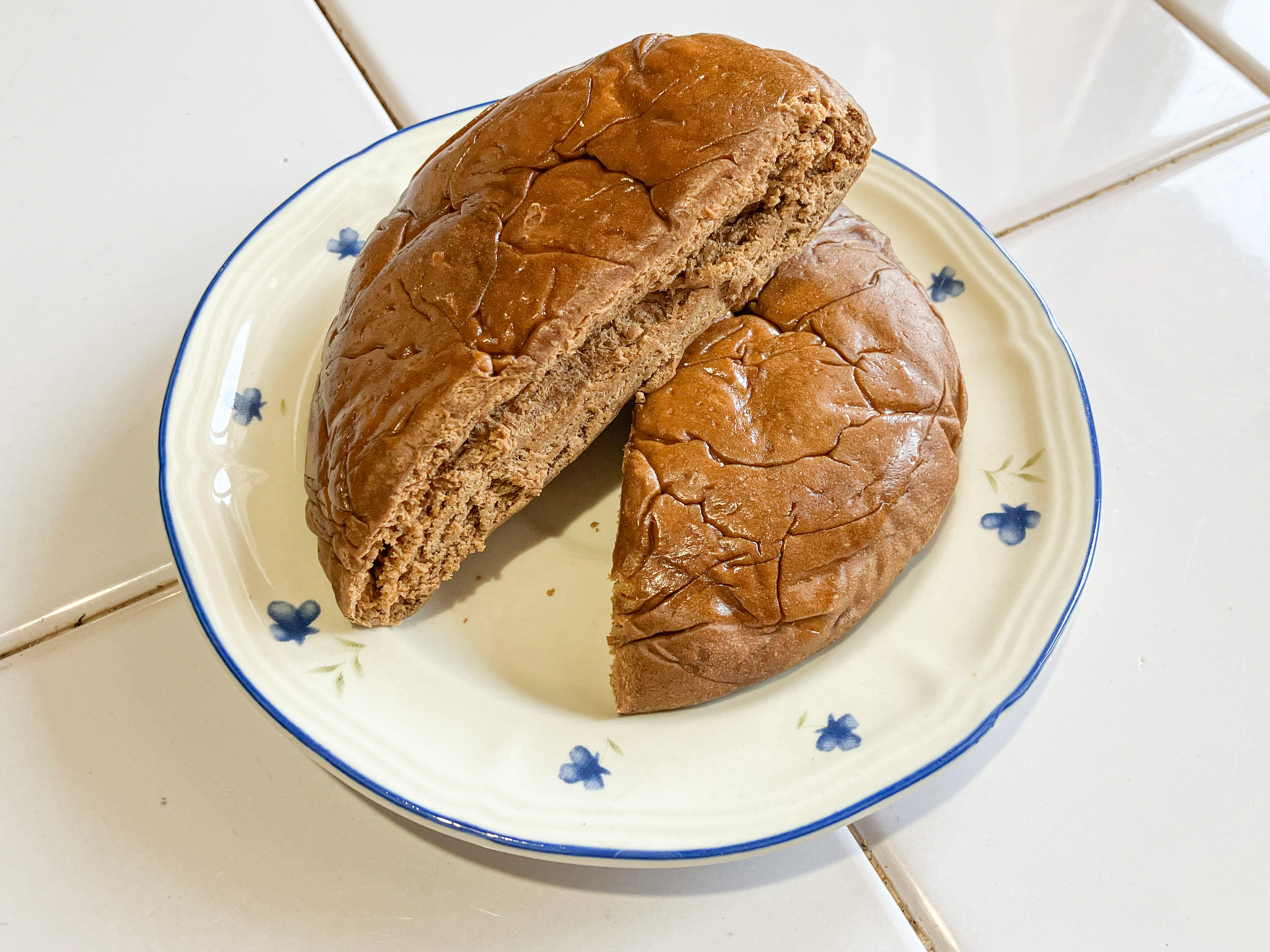

Mogolla is a small, sometimes sweet, bread produced in Colombia, commonly hand-sized or smaller, with a round top and flat bottom.

Mogollas are usually made of wheat or corn meal combinations. One of the most famous versions is filled with pieces of pork rind, called Chicharron. Other versions are sweetened with caramel, honey, or molasses and contain pieces of coconut, nuts, or dried fruit, and sometimes cinnamon.
