= Rellenitos de plátano =

Guatemalan dish

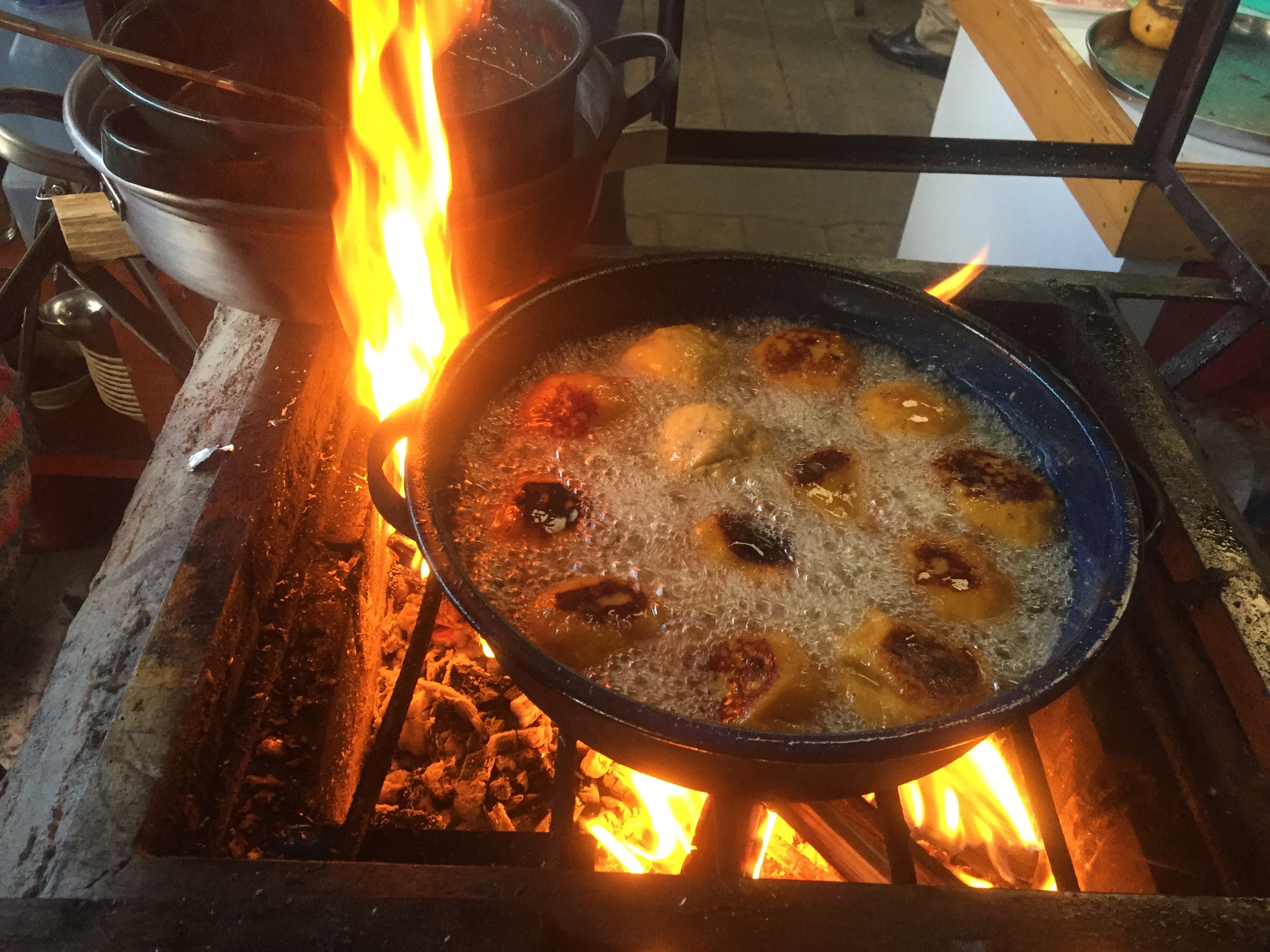
Plaintains being cooked for rellenitos de plátano

Rellenitos de plátano is a dish of sweet mashed plantains stuffed with a mixture of refried beans, chocolate, and cinnamon. The assembled egg-shaped balls are deep-fried, and then served with either powdered sugar or honey on top. It is a common and very popular dessert in the cuisine of Guatemala.

== Etymology ==
Rellenitos de plátano utilizes two of the most prevalent foods in the Latin American culture, black beans, known as frijoles negros in Spanish, and ripe plantains or plátanos. Rellenito comes from the verb rellenar which means to stuff or fill. The suffix ito in Spanish is known as a diminutive. Hence rellenitos de plátano could be translated as "little stuffed plantain things".

== Preparation ==
To prepare rellenitos, plantains are cut into medium-sized pieces and boiled with cinnamon until tender. Once they are tender, normally after about ten minutes of cooking time they are removed, mashed into a paste and set aside to cool. The paste is then formed into a small thick tortilla by hand, leaving the center indented resembling a small bowl. The bowl is then filled with a mixture of black refried beans, chocolate and cinnamon. The filling itself is made by melting Guatemalan or Maya chocolate in water and then adding refried beans and cinnamon. The bowl is then closed by wrapping the ends of the tortilla until it closes, creating something that resembles an egg — the plantain paste being the shell, with a black bean, chocolate, and cinnamon filling. The rellenito is then fried in a pan with oil until golden brown on all sides. They are generally served with either honey or powdered sugar on top.

Rellenitos are served year-round and are typical Guatemalan cuisine. They are very inexpensive and easy to prepare.

== See also ==
- List of stuffed dishes
