= Lechon kawali =

Filipino-style deep-fried pork belly

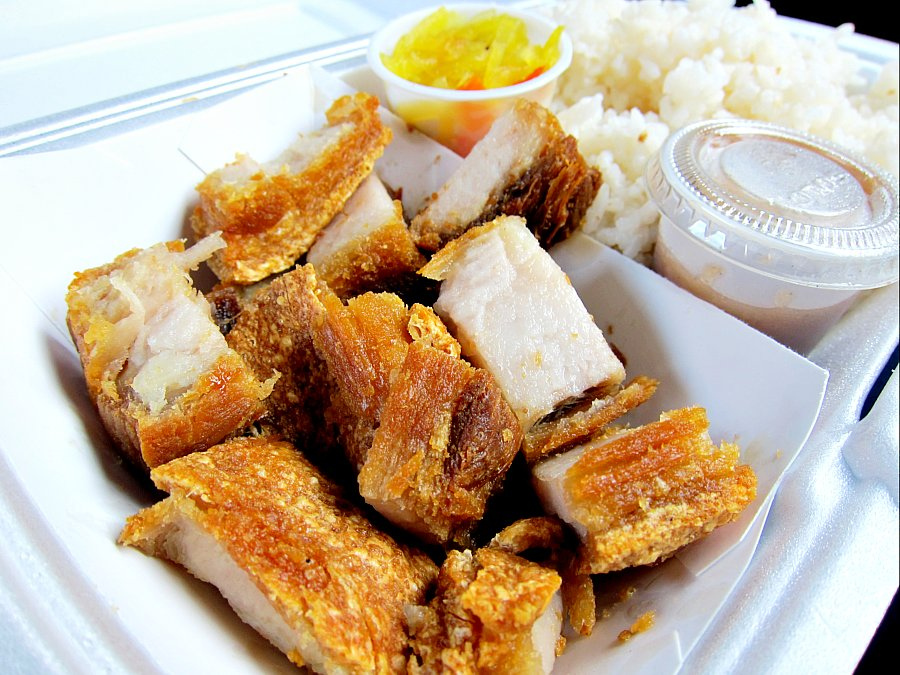
- Lechon kawali with rice, dipping sauce and atchara pickles
- Alternative names: Lechon de carajay, litsong kawali (Tagalog)
- Course: Main course
- Place of origin: Philippines
- Serving temperature: Hot
- Main ingredients: Pork belly

Lechon kawali, also known as lechon de carajay or litsong kawali in Tagalog, is a Filipino recipe consisting of pork belly slabs deep-fried in a pan or wok (kawali). It is seasoned beforehand, cooked then served in cubes. It is usually accompanied with a dipping sauce such as sarsa ng lechon (lechon sauce) made from vinegar and pork liver or toyomansi (soy sauce with calamansi).

When deep-fried extensively until golden brown and crispy, it becomes the Ilocano bagnet, a variant of chicharon. Lechon kawali is also a common accompaniment or ingredient to stir-fried water spinach with shrimp paste (binagoongang kangkong).

== See also ==
- Bagnet
- Lechon
