= Tapado =

Central American seafood

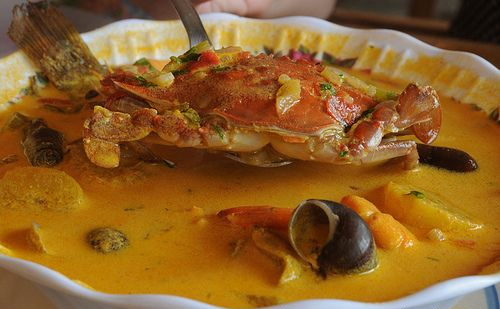
- A bowl of tapado with crab and other ingredients visible
- Alternative names: Tapado Costeño
- Type: Soup
- Place of origin: Belize, Guatemala, Honduras
- Associated cuisine: Belizean cuisine, Caribbean cuisine, Guatemalan cuisine, Honduran cuisine
- Serving temperature: Hot
- Main ingredients: Seafood, including: whitefish, crab, scallop, shrimp and prawn as food, and others; coconut milk, plantain; vegetables as sofrito.

Tapado is a seafood soup served in Central American countries such as Guatemala and Honduras. It uses coconut milk and seafood as well as plantains. Within these countries, tapado is associated with the Garifuna community.
