= Bagnet =

Filipino pork dish

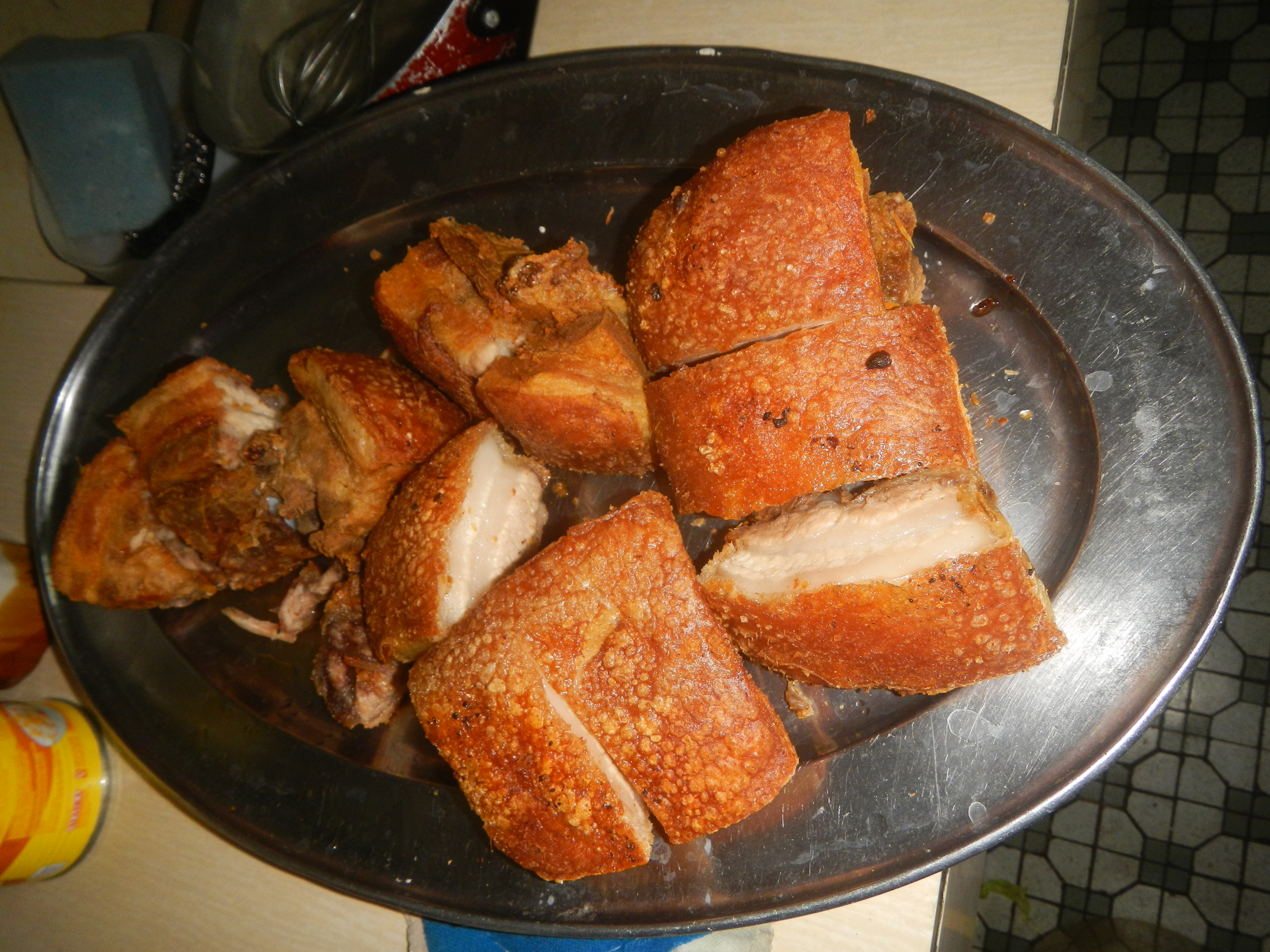
- Bagnet from Ilocos Norte, Philippines
- Alternative names: Chicharron, Tsitsaron
- Course: Main course
- Place of origin: Philippines
- Region or state: Ilocos

Bagnet (Northern Ilocano and Tagalog pronunciation: [bɐgˈnɛt], Southern Ilocano pronunciation: [bɐgˈnɯt]), also locally known as "chicharon" or tsitsaron in Ilocano, is a Filipino dish consisting of pork belly (liempo) boiled and deep fried until it is crispy. It is seasoned with garlic, black peppercorns, bay leaves, and salt. First, the meat is boiled, and, then allowed to thoroughly drain excess moisture overnight before frying, to achieve its characteristic chicharon-like texture. Bagnet can be eaten on its own or with white rice. It can also be used as an ingredient or paired with other dishes like pinakbet and dinardaraan.

Bagnet is traditionally dipped in vinegar-based sauces (usually sukang iloko), bagoong (fermented fish or shrimp paste), or (more rarely) pig's blood.

== Etymology ==
Bagnet came from the word "bagnetin", which means to “preserve the pork”. They are preserved by boiling and frying the slabs of pork before refrigerating, and then twice fried when ready to serve.

== In popular culture ==
The popularity of bagnet served as a character plot point in the Filipino film I'm Drunk, I Love You with Carson, played by Maja Salvador, depicted craving for the dish to the point of creating an impromptu "bagnet dance" to celebrate it.

== See also ==
- Crispy pata
- Lechon kawali
