= Salsa verde =

Spicy Mexican sauce made from tomatillos

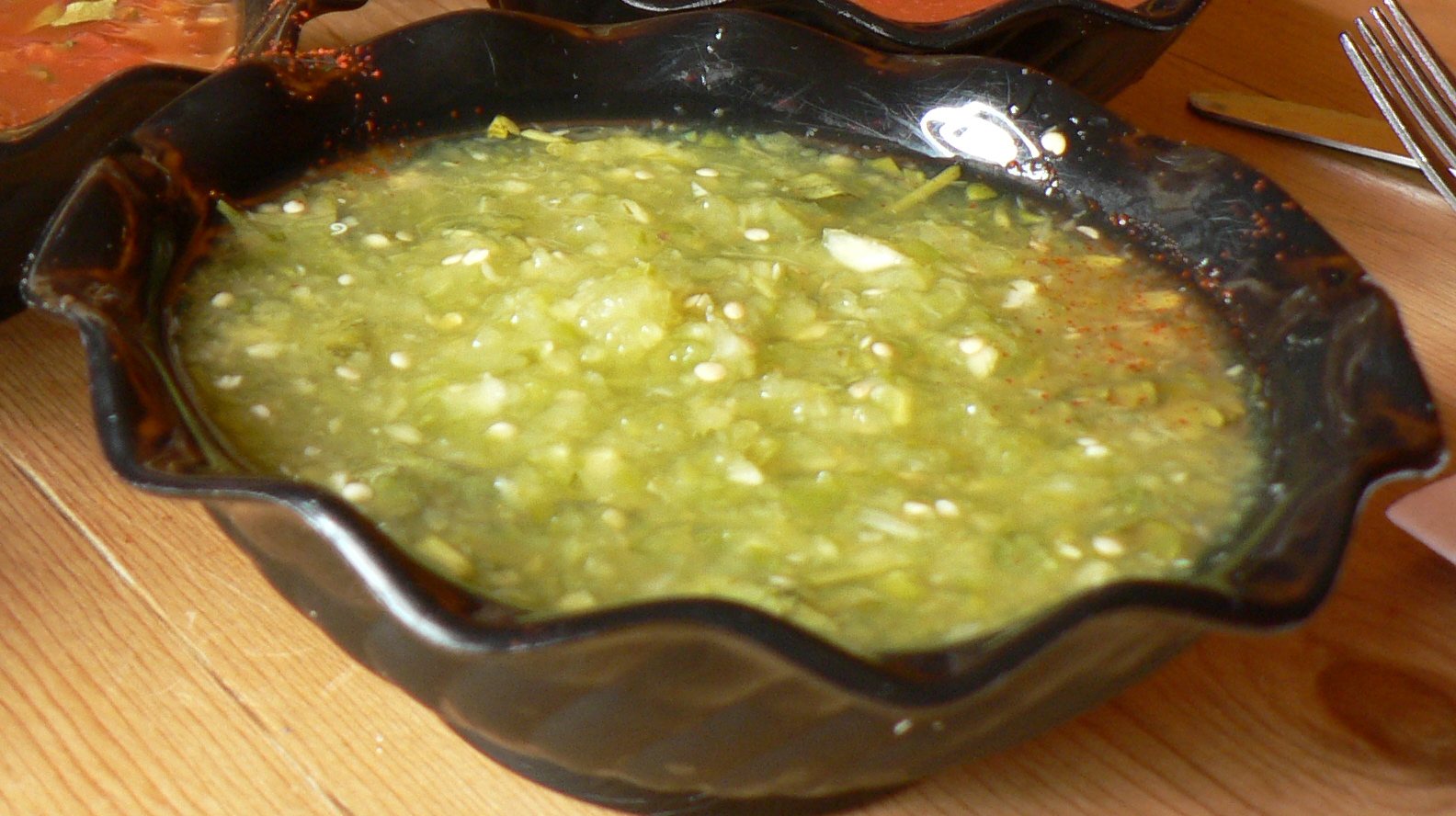
- Type: Green sauce
- Place of origin: Mexico
- Main ingredients: Tomatillo, chili pepper

In Mexican cuisine, salsa verde (lit. 'green sauce') is a spicy green sauce made from tomatillo and green chili peppers. It dates to the Aztec Empire, as documented by the Spanish physician Francisco Hernández, and is distinct from the various medieval European parsley-based green sauces.

In the cuisines of Mexico and the Southwestern United States, it is often served with Mexican or Tex-Mex dishes such as enchiladas and chicharrón (pork rinds). The version typical of New Mexico consists mostly of green chile rather than tomatillos.

== Types ==
This green sauce comes in subtypes: cooked sauce, in which the ingredients are cooked and then ground; roasted salsa, in which the elements are roasted on a comal and then ground; raw sauce, in which ingredients are ground and eaten without cooking; and a combination in which some of the elements are cooked. A molcajete or a blender can be used for the grinding process. Cooking or roasting the tomatillos will enhance the flavor, providing a sweeter salsa. After the sauce is prepared, it can be cooked again in a pan with a little oil.

== See also ==
- Green sauce
- Pipián (sauce), another Mexican green sauce
