= Kak'ik =

Guatemalan turkey leg stew

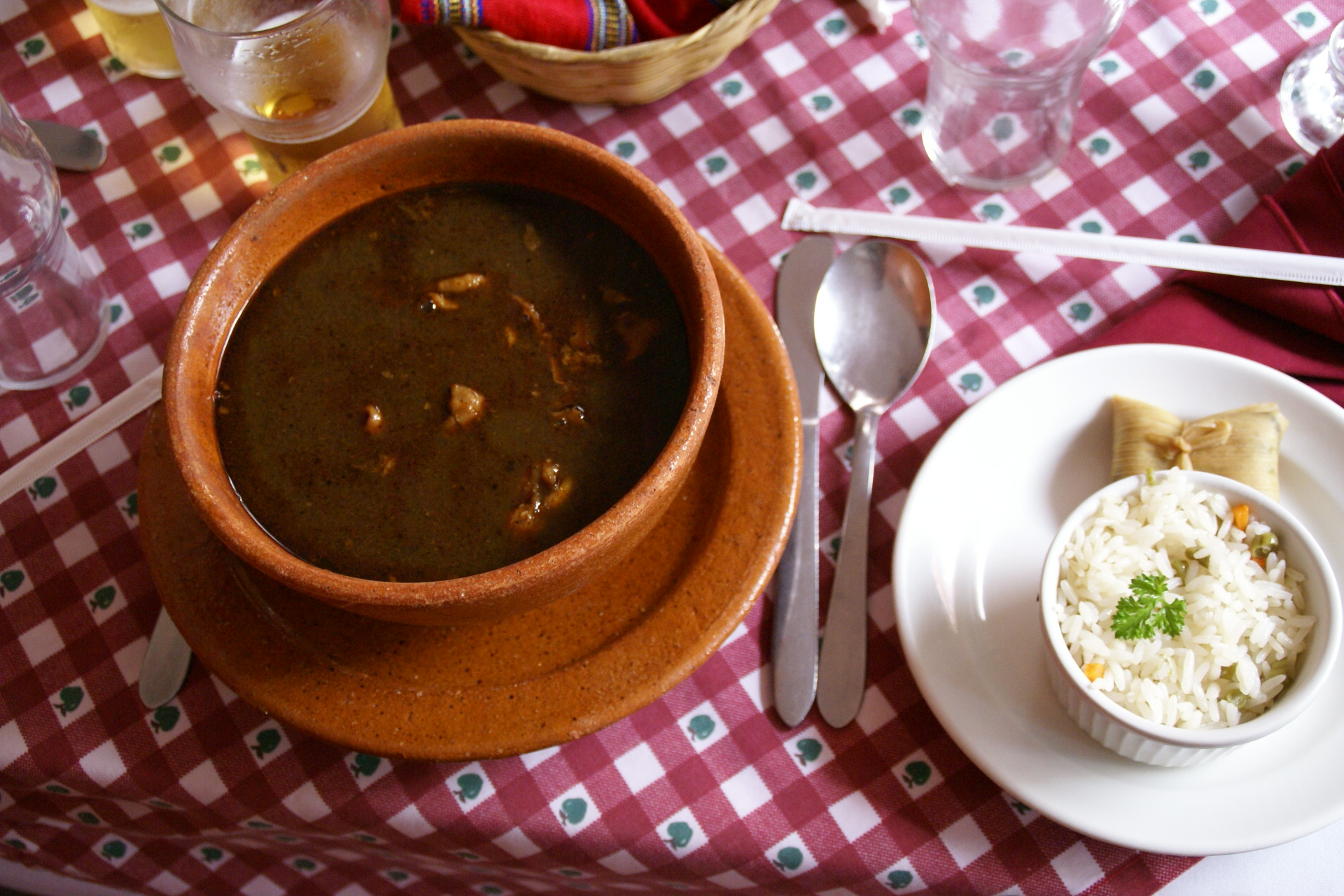
- Kak'ik
- Place of origin: Guatemala
- Main ingredients: Turkey leg

Kak'ik is a soup made from a type of turkey called "chompipe" and is typical of Guatemalan cuisine. It is a pre-Hispanic food, and the name is of Mayan origin: it derives from the Q'eqchi' words kak (red) and ik (hot or very spicy). In 2007, it was declared part of the "Intangible Cultural Heritage of the Nation".

Although there are regional variations, the traditional recipe of the Las Verapaces region includes chompipe, garlic, onion, peppermint, coriander and Eryngium foetidum (zamat) leaves. The red color is due to the ground annatto.

Its red color can be associated with the blood that was used in pre-Columbian ritual sacrifices.

It is generally accompanied with rice, white tamales wrapped in Calathea lutea (mashán) leaves, chili and a cocoa drink.
