= Pipián (sauce) =

Mexican green sauce

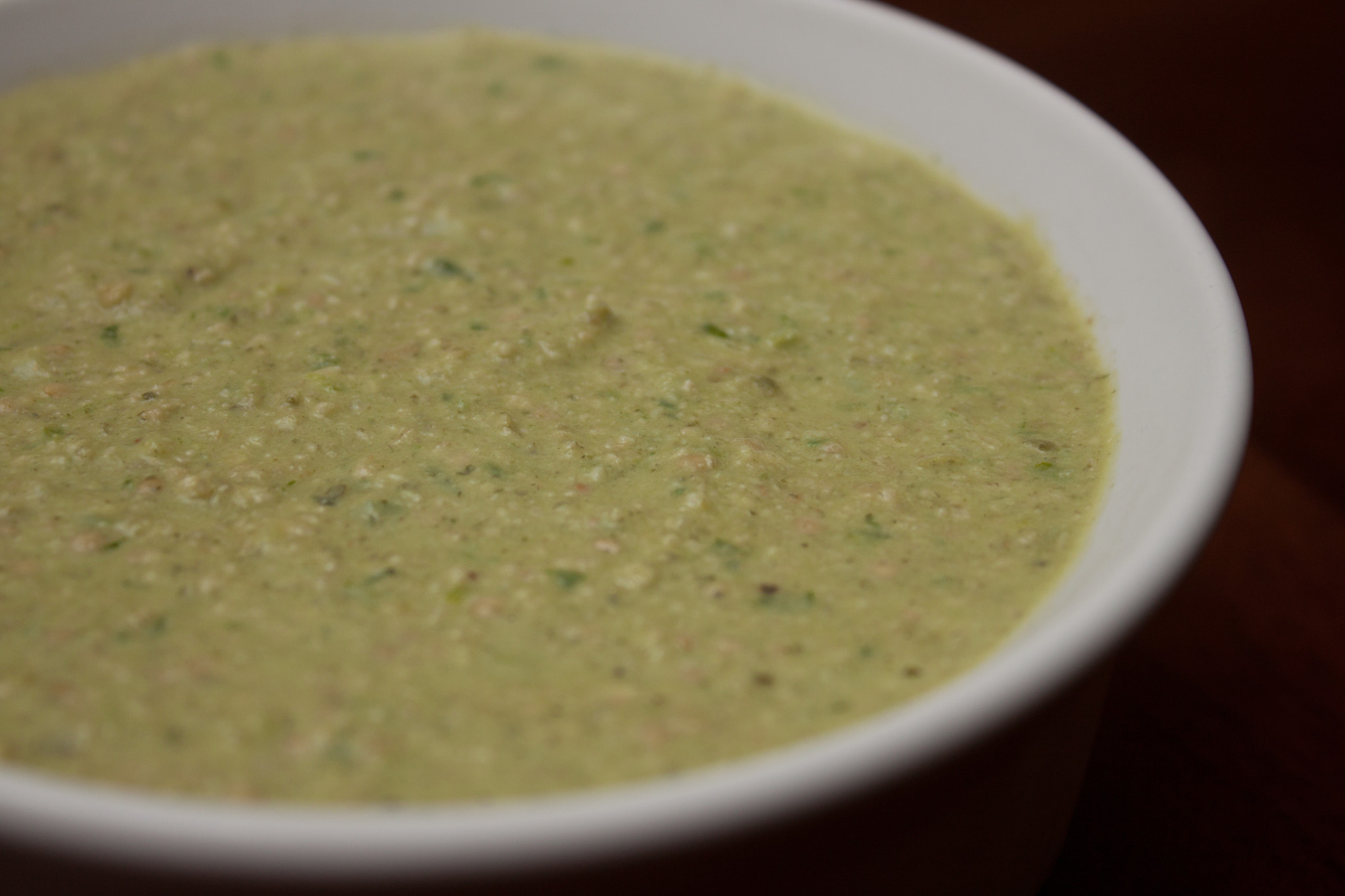
Green pipian sauce

Pipián is a sauce from Mexican cuisine made with puréed greens and thickened with ground pumpkin seeds. The sauce is said to have origins in the ancient Aztec, Purepecha and Mayan cuisines.

The greens used to make the sauce include tomatillos and peppers such as poblano, serrano and jalapeño. It can be served with carnitas, and roasted poultry or vegetables, or served as an enchilada sauce. It is sometimes added to rice and beans to enhance flavor or worked into dough to make spicy tamales.

Other ingredients used for the sauce are sesame seeds, ancho chile, peanuts and spices such as cinnamon, cumin and garlic.
