= Subanik =

Guatemalan stew-like dish

Subanik is a ceremonial stew-like dish originated from the Maya of Guatemala. A variety of chili peppers as well as meats are characteristic of this dish and the main components of its flavor. The dish is usually served alongside rice and tamales.

== Origin ==
Subanik is attributed to a specific region in Guatemala, San Martin Jilotepeque. This dish originated amongst the Kaqchikel Maya of Guatemala. Though the original dish has diversified as it may appear in homes today, the concept, as its name suggests, is still the same. The ending “-ik” in the Kaqchikel language in referring to a dish means that chilies are part of the dish.
