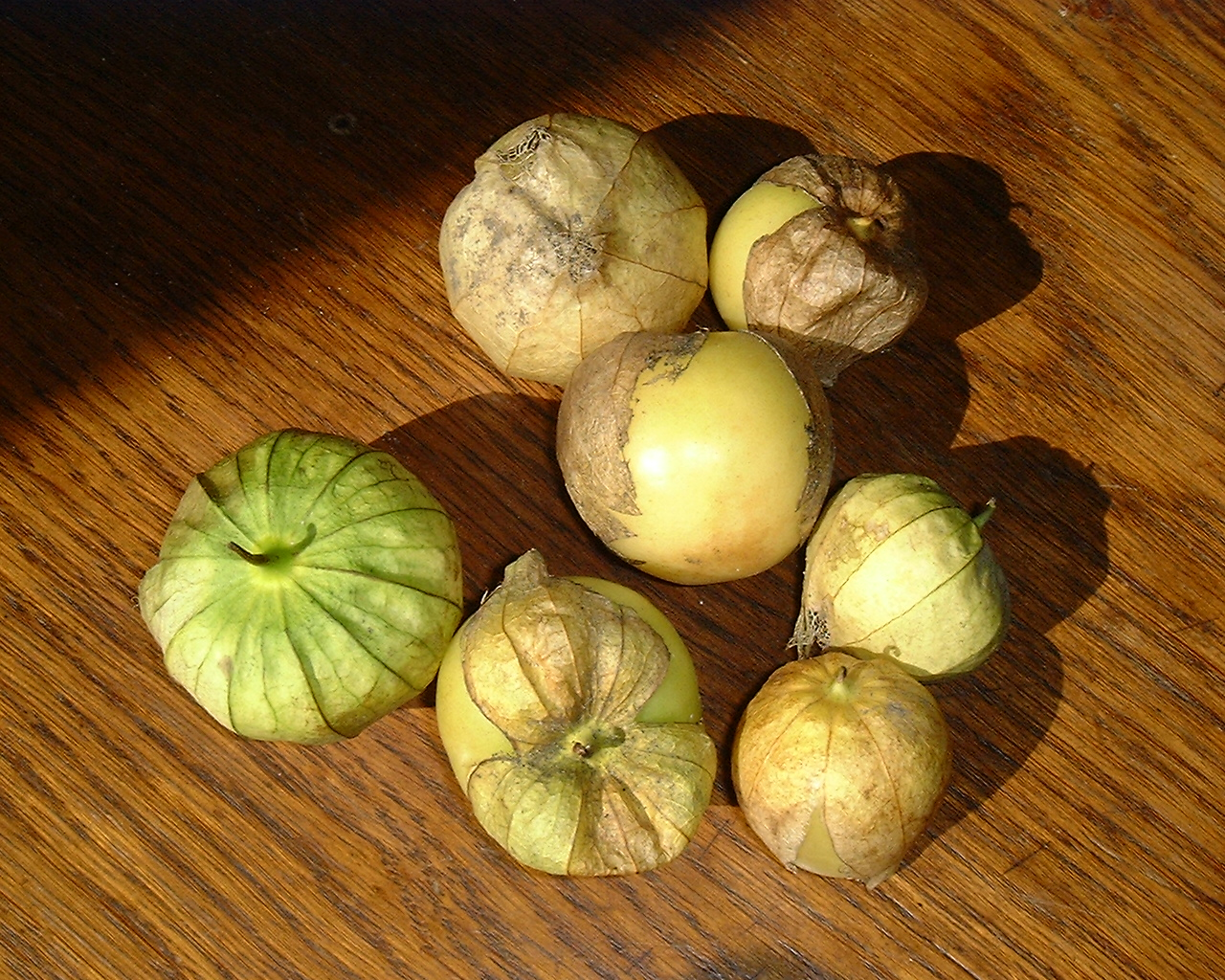
- Tomatillos

Scientific classification
- Kingdom: Plantae
- Clade: Tracheophytes
- Clade: Angiosperms
- Clade: Eudicots
- Clade: Asterids
- Order: Solanales
- Family: Solanaceae
- Genus: Physalis
- Species: P. philadelphica

Binomial name
- Physalis philadelphica Lam. (1786)

Synonyms
- Physalis ixocarpa Brot.

= Tomatillo =

Species of plant

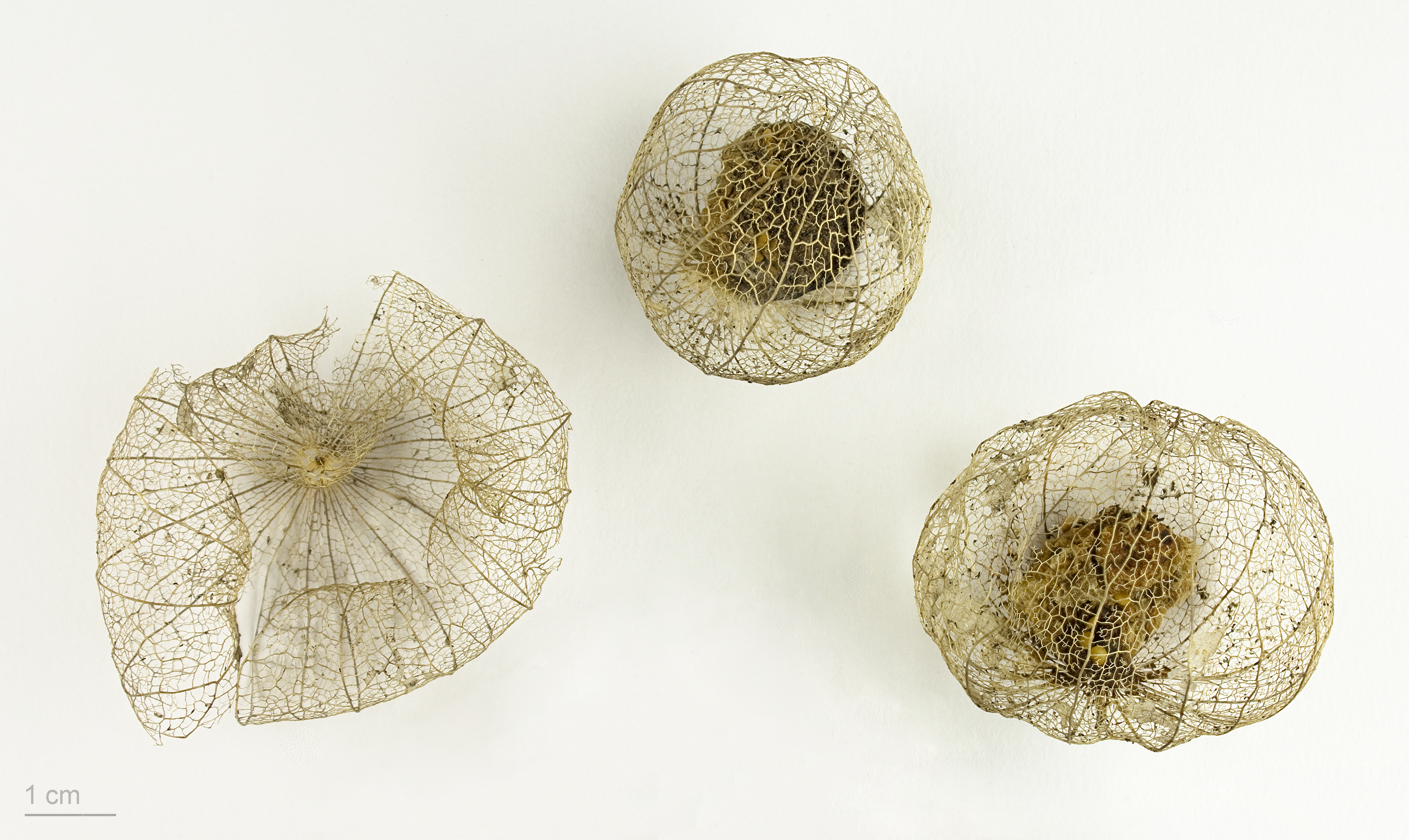
Physalis ixocarpa – MHNT

The tomatillo (Physalis philadelphica and Physalis ixocarpa), also known as the Mexican husk tomato, is a plant of the nightshade family bearing small, spherical, and green or green-purple fruit. Tomatillos originated in Mexico and were cultivated in the pre-Columbian era. A staple of Mexican cuisine, they are eaten both raw and cooked in a variety of dishes, notably salsa verde. The tomatillo is a perennial plant, but is generally grown for agriculture each year as if it were an annual.

== Names ==
The tomatillo (from Nahuatl, tomatl) is also known as husk tomato, Mexican groundcherry, large-flowered tomatillo, or Mexican husk tomato. Some of these names, however, can also refer to other species in the genus Physalis. Other names are Mexican green tomato and miltomate.

In Spanish, it is called tomate de cáscara (husk tomato), tomate de fresadilla (little strawberry tomato), tomate milpero (field tomato), tomate verde (green tomato), tomatillo (Mexico; this term means "little tomato" elsewhere), miltomate (Mexico, Guatemala), farolito (little lantern), or simply tomate (in which case the tomato is called jitomate from Nahuatl xitomatl).

The tomatillo genus name Physalis is from New Latin physalis, coined by Linnaeus from Ancient Greek φυσαλλίς (physallís, "bladder, wind instrument"), itself from φυσιόω (physióō, "to puff up, blow up"), φυσώ (physṓ).

Ixocarpa means "slimy fruit", referencing a sticky or slimy coat often on a tomatillo before it ruptures from the calyx.

== Distribution ==
Tomatillos are native to Central America and Mexico, having a wild growth range from Mexico to Costa Rica. The plant is grown mostly in the Mexican states of Hidalgo and Morelos, and in the highlands of Guatemala where it is known as miltomate. In the United States, tomatillos have been cultivated since 1863, with one dubbed "jamberry" in 1945 and others with the names "Mayan husk tomato" and "jumbo husk tomato". Further distribution occurred in the Bahamas, Puerto Rico, Jamaica, and Florida. By the middle of the 20th century, the plant was further exported to India, Australia, South Africa, and Kenya.

The wild tomatillo and related plants are found everywhere in the Americas except in the far north, with the highest diversity in Mexico. In 2017, scientists reported on their discovery and analysis of Physalis infinemundi, a fossil Physalis found in the Patagonian region of Argentina, dated to 52 million years BP. The finding has pushed back the earliest appearance of the Solanaceae plant family and the Physalis genus of which the tomatillo is a part.

== Cultivation ==
=== History ===
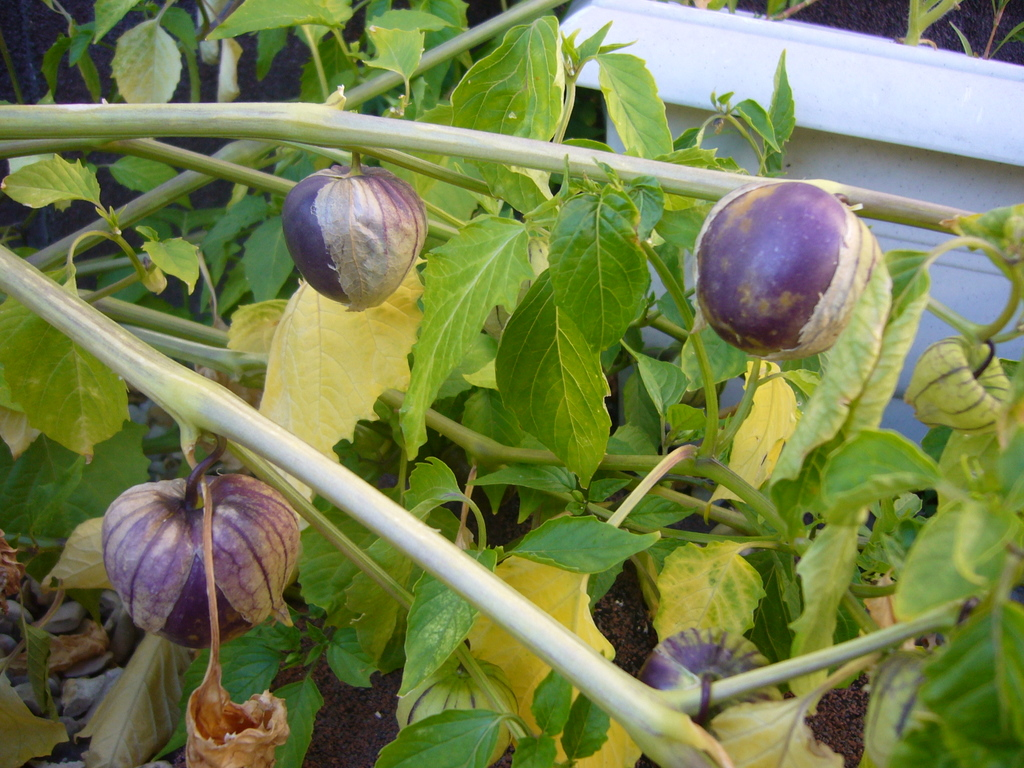
Purple tomatillos (Physalis ixocarpa)

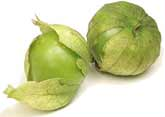
Green tomatillos (Physalis philadelphica)

Tomatillos were domesticated in Mexico before the coming of Europeans and played an important part in the culture of the Maya and the Aztecs, more important than the tomato. Nonetheless, the tomatillo has been gradually overshadowed by the tomato due to factors including the Colombian Exchange, and European culinary biases.The specific name philadelphica dates to the 18th century.

=== Production ===
There is limited information about tomatillo production, even though tomatillos are distributed and grown worldwide as a home-grown garden plant. Tomatillos are mainly cultivated in outdoor fields in Mexico and Guatemala on a large scale. Smaller crops are planted in many parts of the United States. In Mexico, tomatillos are planted within a wide range of altitudes.

=== Soil and climate requirements ===
In general, tomatillo plants are tolerant of many different soil conditions. However, they do best in well-drained, sandy, fertile soil conditions with a pH between 5.5 and 7.3. Tomatillo plants are cold sensitive. They grow best at 25 to 32 °C (77 to 90 °F). Below 16 °C (61 °F), growth is very poor. Tomatillo plants prefer full sun exposure and warm locations.

=== Seedbed requirement and sowing ===
Transplanting is the most common practice for planting tomatillo plants. Transplants are produced in greenhouses or transplant beds. Germination occurs at 20 to 27 °C (68 to 81 °F). Transplanting occurs 6 to 8 weeks after seeding and when the risk of frost is past. Transplants produced indoors need to harden off in a warm, sunny place for a few days before being planted outside. Direct outdoor seeding can only be done if no frost risk exists and soil temperature is higher than 15 °C (59 °F). Direct outdoor seeding leads to the shortening of the vegetation period. Due to its branching growing pattern, a single plant requires sufficient growing space. Tomatillos are typically grown in rows 0.7 to 1.6 m (2 ft 4 in to 5 ft 3 in) apart. Although tomatillo is a perennial plant, overwintering is difficult, so it is normally cultivated as an annual plant.

=== Fertilization and field management ===
Tomatillo plants can reach heights of 1.5 to 2 meters (5 to 6 1/2 ft). Due to their rapid and branching growth, it is recommended to stake them. Staking also facilitates later harvesting and prevents the fruit from touching the ground, which reduces damage to fruit and husk. Staking can also reduce disease and slug damage. Fertilization is recommended at a moderate level. An application of 40–90 kg/ha (36–80 lb/acre) of phosphorus is common. Other nutrients and fertilizers (N/ K) may be required depending on soil type and irrigation. For non-commercial production, regular fertilization is recommended. Although tomatillo plants become more drought-tolerant as they age, regular watering is required. Tomatillo plants require 25–38 mm (1–1 1/2 in) of water per week. Water can come from rainfall or irrigation. Irrigation can be managed by drip, sprinkler, furrow, or watering can. Irrigation frequency depends on weather and the crop's growth stage, ranging from once or twice a week to daily during hot weather. Weeds are a serious challenge in tomatillo production and are especially important during the first few weeks. Plastic and organic mulches help to control weeds effectively. Applications of plastic mulches also help to restrict soil water evaporation and modify microclimate, thereby affecting tomatillo growth and yield.

=== Harvest and postharvest treatment ===
Tomatillos are harvested when the fruits fill the calyx. This state is normally achieved 65 to 100 days after transplanting. Fruit production continues for 1 to 2 months or until the first frost. Harvesting occurs regularly, typically every day, and is done by hand. A plant produces 60 to 200 fruits within a single growing season, with an average yield of about 20 tonnes per hectare (9 short tons per acre). Tomatillos can be stored for up to three weeks in a cold and humid environment.

== Culinary uses ==
Tomatillos can be harvested at different stages of ripeness. For salsa verde, harvesting may be done early when the fruit is sour with a light flavor. Tomatillos can be picked later when the fruits are seedier for a sweeter taste. Tomatillos have diverse uses in stews, soups, salads, curries, stirfries, baking, cooking with meats, marmalade, and desserts.

Tomatillos are a key ingredient in fresh and cooked Mexican and Central-American green sauces. The green color and tart flavor are the main culinary contributions of the fruit. Purple and red-ripening cultivars often have a slight sweetness, unlike the green- and yellow-ripening cultivars, so they generally are used in jams and preserves. Like their close relative, the Cape gooseberry, tomatillos have a high pectin content. Another characteristic is that they tend to have a varying degree of a sappy, sticky coating, mostly when used on the green side out of the husk.

Ripe tomatillos keep refrigerated for about two weeks. They keep longer with the husks removed and the fruit refrigerated in sealed plastic bags. They may also be frozen whole or sliced.

Tomatillos can also be dried to enhance the sweetness of the fruit in a way similar to dried cranberries, with a hint of tomato flavor. The tomatillo flavor is used in fusion cuisines for blending flavors from Latin American dishes with those of Europe and North America.

== Botany ==
=== Description ===
P. ixocarpa is often confused with P. philadelphica due to morphological similarities and the fact that neither species have had a clear type designation. Physalis ixocarpa and Physalis philadelphica have blue anthers that twist after opening, a yellow corolla with five blue-tinged spots or smudges, and a 10-ribbed calyx filled or burst by the berry. The two species differ in flower size and stigma type.

P. philadelphica grow up to 15 to 60 cm (6 to 24 in) and have few hairs on the stem. The leaves have acute and irregularly separated dents on the side. They are typically about one meter (3 ft) in height, and can be either compact and upright or prostrate with a wider, less dense canopy. The leaves are typically serrated and can be either smooth or pubescent.

=== Classification ===
The tomatillo is a member of the genus Physalis, classified by Carl Linnaeus in 1753. Jean-Baptiste de Lamarck described the tomatillo under the name Physlis philadelphica in 1786. Other species, such as P. aeuata and P. violacea were described later. The tomatillo is also often classified as P. ixocarpa Brot. However, P. philadelphica is the most important species economically. The nomenclature for Physalis has changed since the 1950s. P. philadelphica was at one time classified as a variety of P. ixocarpa. Later, the classification of P. ixocarpa was revised under the species of P. philadelphica. Today, the name P. ixocarpa is commonly used for the domestic plant and P. philadelphica for the wild one.

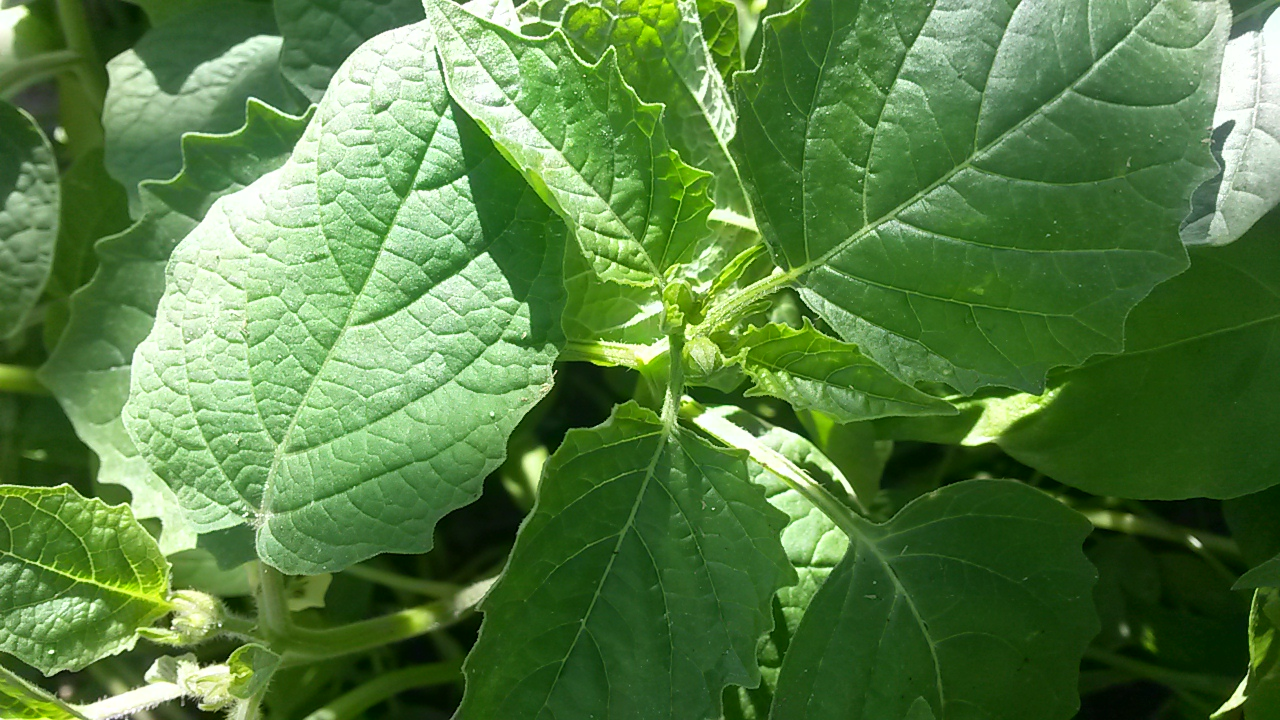
Tomatillo plant with buds, pubescent stem and serrated leaves noticeable

=== Flower ===
Flowers come in several colors: white, light green, bright yellow, and sometimes purple. Flowers may or may not have purple spots toward the center of the corolla. The anthers are typically dark purple to pale blue. Tomatillo plants are highly self-incompatible, and two or more plants are needed for proper pollination. Thus, isolated tomatillo plants rarely set fruit.

=== Fruit ===
The tomatillo fruit is surrounded by an inedible, paper-like husk formed from the calyx. As the fruit matures, it fills the husk and can split it open by harvest time. The husk turns brown, and the fruit can be ripe in several colors, including yellow, green, or even purple. The freshness and greenness of the husk are quality criteria.

Flower types

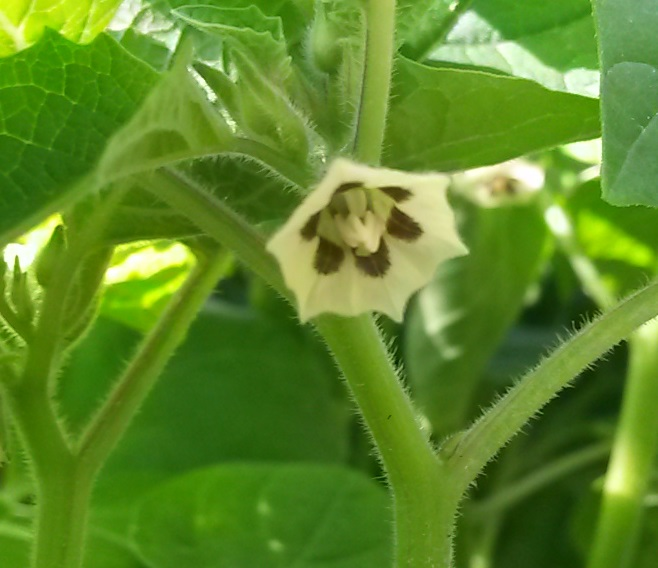

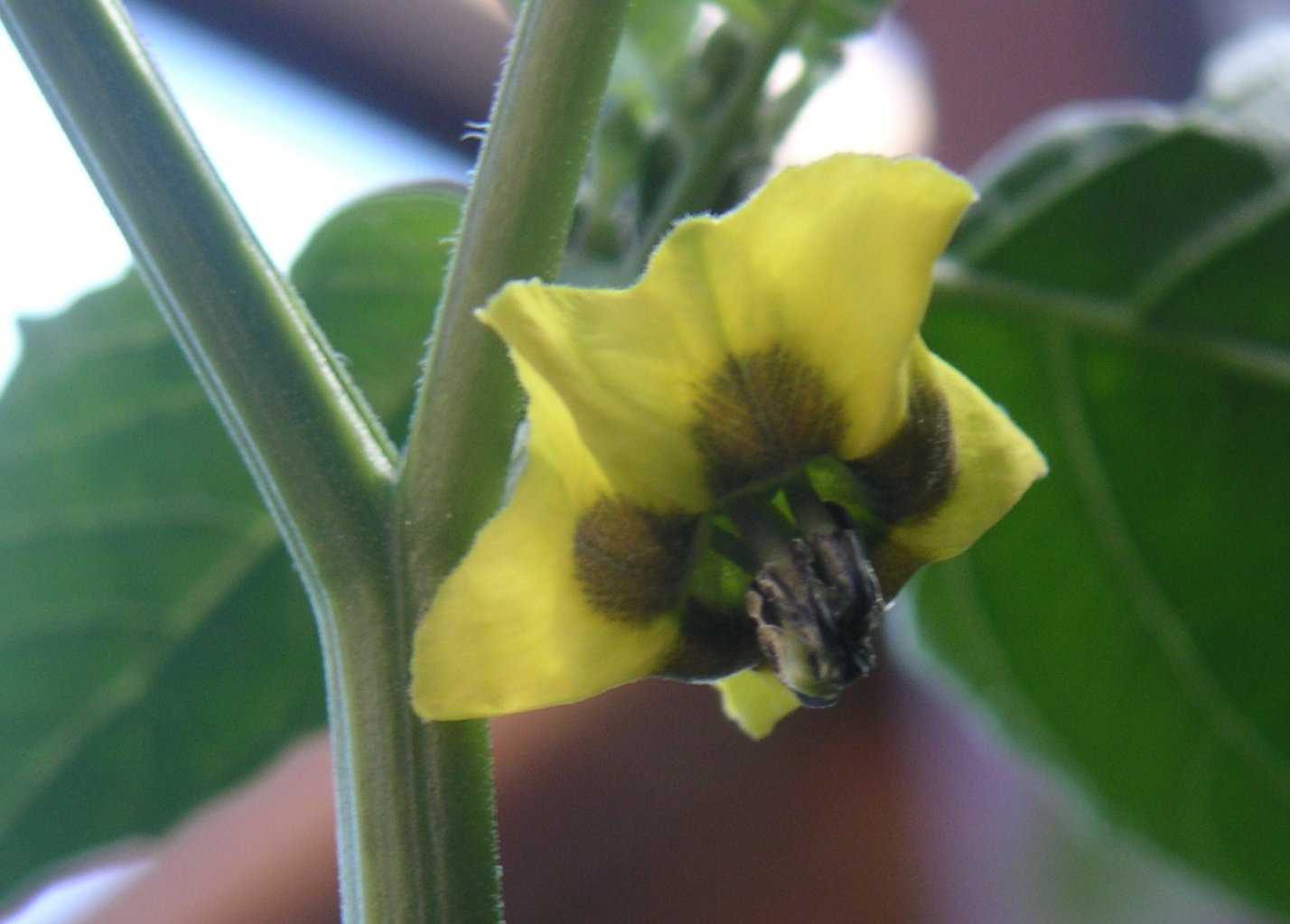

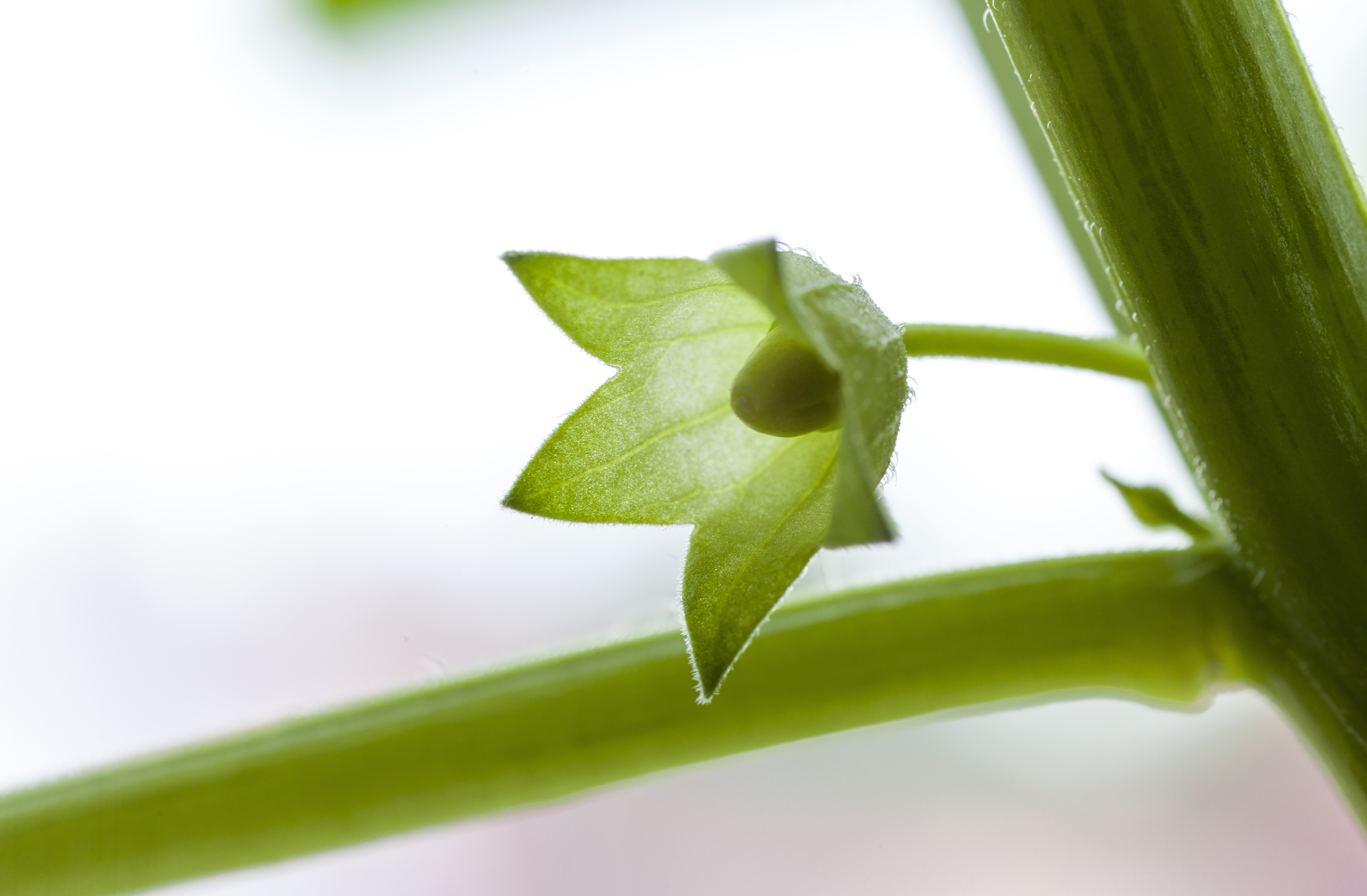

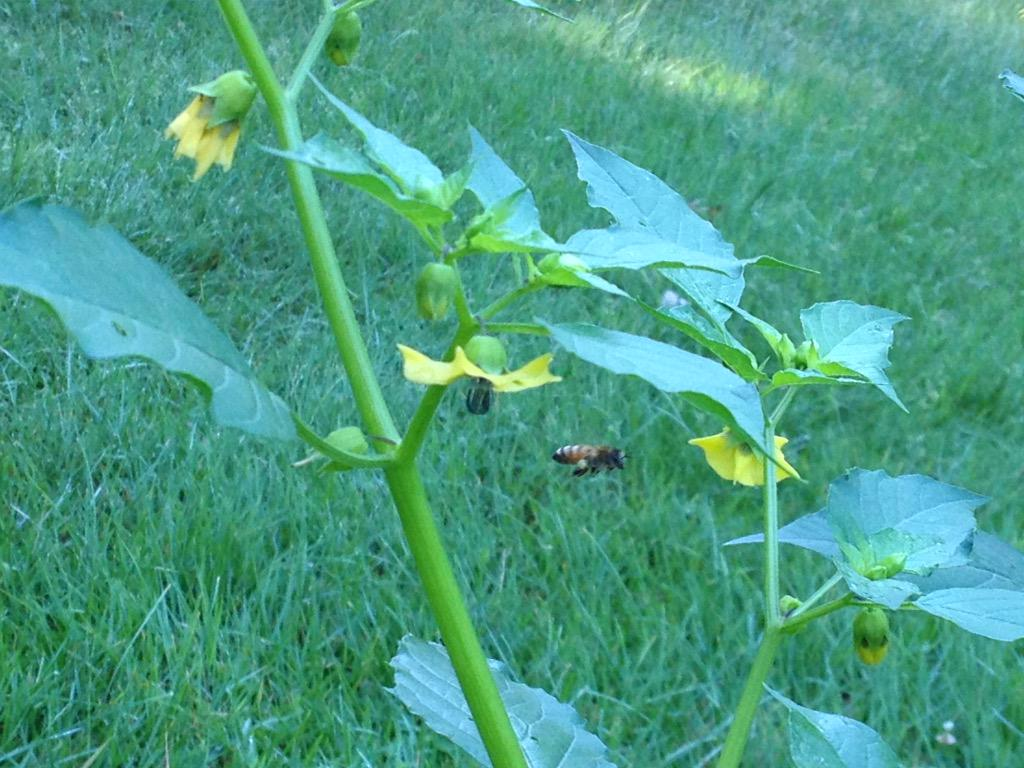

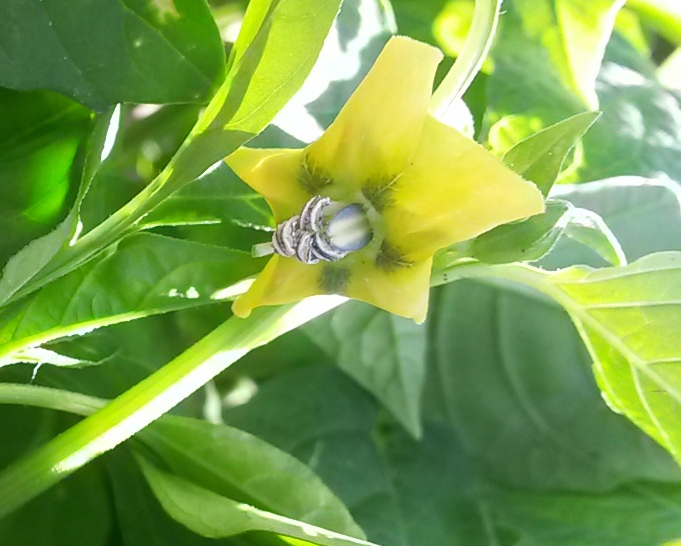

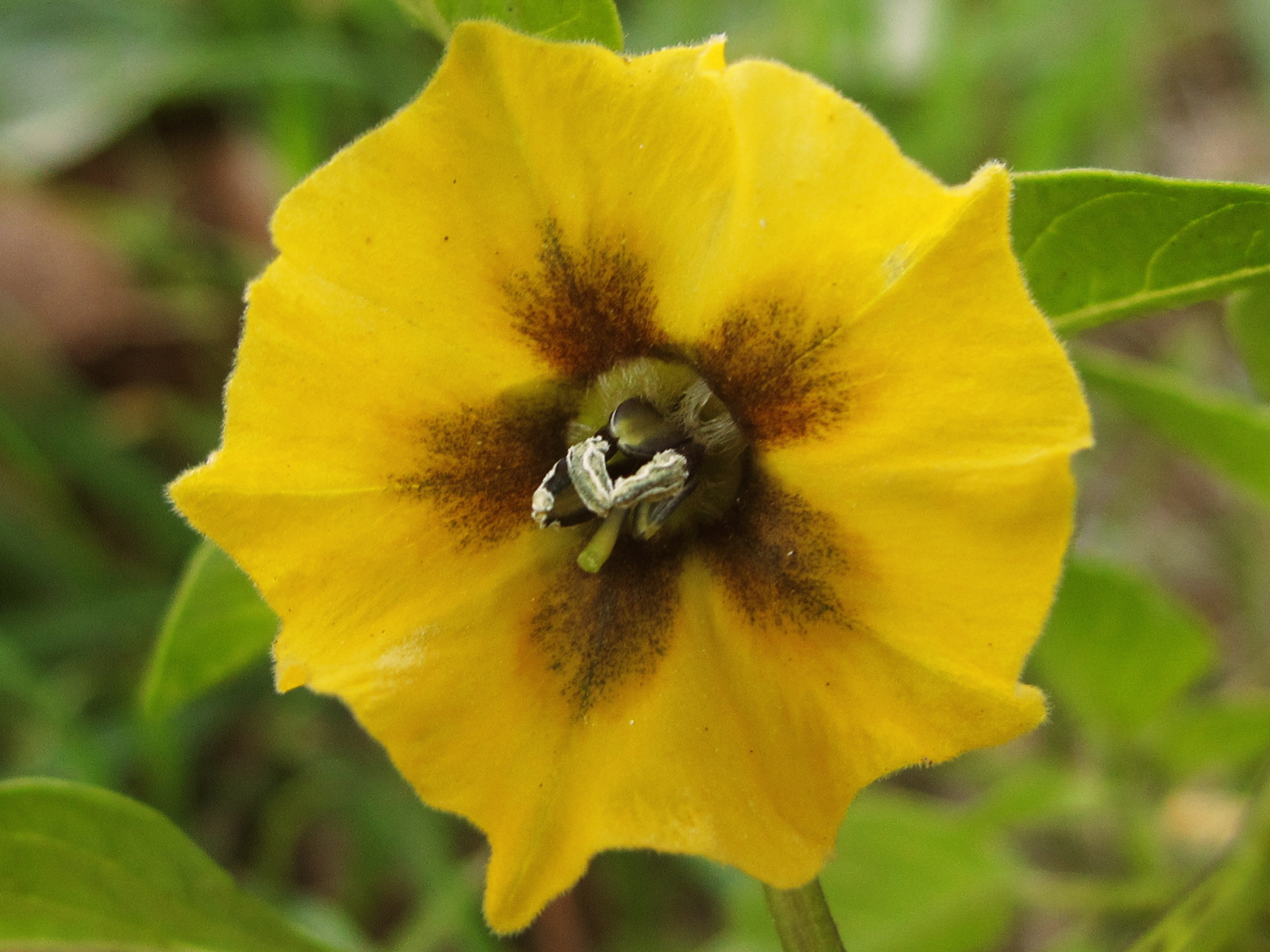

=== Varieties ===
There are several varieties of tomatillos, with differences in tastes, traits, and ripening colors. Some cultivars include Amarylla, Chupon, Gigante, Green Husk, Mexican, Pineapple, Purple de Milpa, Rio Grande Verde, and Yellow.

=== Genetic ===
==== Self-incompatibility trait ====
Although self-compatibility is common among wild populations, tomatillos carry self-incompatible traits. The plant, i.e., the fertile hermaphrodite, is not able to produce zygotes after self-pollination occurs. This limits the ability to improve tomatillo production regarding the seed quality and the production of varieties.

The self-compatibility gene is situated in the chromosomes of the tomatillo and is not inherited through cytoplasm. Only heterozygous plants can be self-compatible as the trait is controlled by a dominant gene. Tomatillo can thus produce seeds through self-pollination due to the involvement of self-compatibility traits, but the germination viability is different throughout the produced seeds. This suggests that not only incompatible pollen is involved but also inviability at the seedling stage. A study in 2022 using a commercial cultivar found that it was self-compatible and demonstrated incompatibility only in some of the inter-specific hybrid pollinations that were attempted.

== Diseases ==
Tomatillo is generally a resistant crop as long as its climatic requirements are met. However, as with all crops, mass production brings exposure to pests and diseases. As of 2017, two diseases affecting tomatillos had been documented, namely tomato yellow leaf curl virus and turnip mosaic virus. Symptoms of tomato yellow leaf curl virus, including chlorotic margins and interveinal yellowing, were found in several tomato and tomatillo crops in Mexico and Guatemala in 2006. After laboratory tests, the virus was confirmed. Symptomatic plants were associated with the presence of whiteflies, which were likely the cause of this outbreak.

Turnip mosaic virus was discovered in several tomatillo crops in California in 2011, rendering 2% of commercially grown tomatillo plants unmarketable, with severe stunting and leaf distortion. The green peach aphid is a common pest in California, and since it readily transmits the turnip mosaic virus, this could be a threat to tomatillo production in California.

== See also ==
- Physalis peruviana
- Salsa (sauce)
