= Chicharrón =

Pork dish of Spanish origin

Chicharron
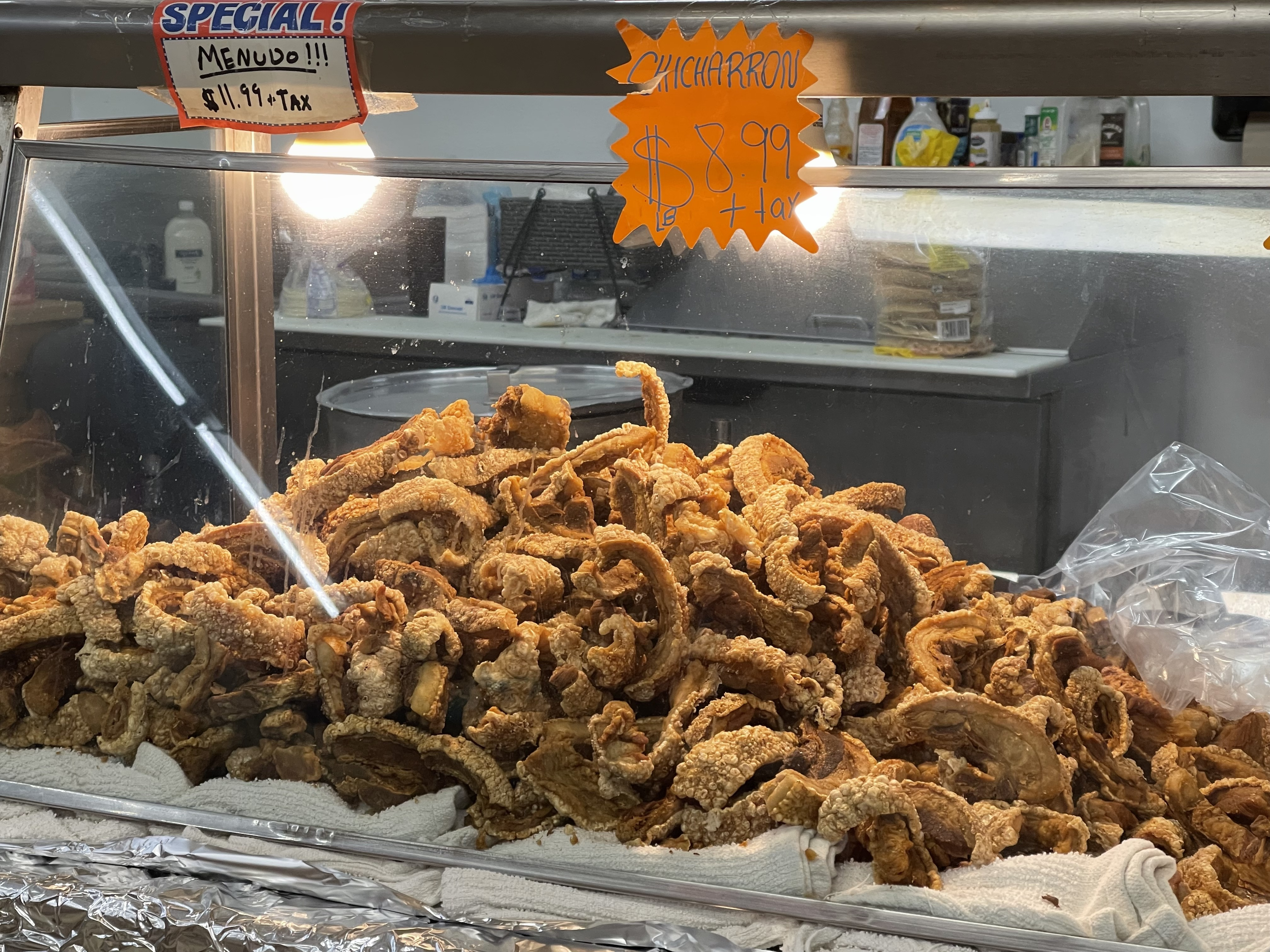
- Traditional pork chicharrones
- Course: Appetizer
- Place of origin: Spain
- Region or state: Latin America, Spain, and the Philippines
- Serving temperature: Hot or cold
- Main ingredients: Pork

Chicharrón is a dish generally consisting of fried pork belly or fried pork rinds. Chicharrón may also be made from chicken, mutton, or beef.

== Name ==
Chicharrón, as a dish with sauces, or chicharrones as finger-food snacks, are popular in Andalusia and Canarias in Spain, Latin America and other places with Spanish influence, including the Southwestern United States. In Spain it is called torrezno outside of Andalusia. It is part of the traditional cuisines of Bolivia, Brazil, Portugal (where it is called torresmo), Chile, Colombia, Costa Rica, Cuba, the Dominican Republic, Ecuador, Guam, Guatemala, Haiti, Honduras, El Salvador, Mexico, Nicaragua, Panama, Peru, the Philippines, Puerto Rico, Venezuela, Belize, and other regions. The singular form of the term or a variant of it is also used as a mass noun in Filipino and Tagalog, languages in which stand-alone plurals do not exist.

Chicharrones are usually made from various cuts of pork but sometimes with mutton, chicken, or other meats. In some places, they are made from pork ribs with skin attached and other meatier cuts, rather than just rinds.

== National variants ==
The pork rind variant is the skin of the pork after it has been seasoned and deep-fried often to a crispy, puffy state. Other styles may be fatty or meaty, not fried as much, and sometimes attached to ribs or other bones. In Mexico, they are eaten in a taco or gordita with salsa verde. Serving styles vary widely, including main course, side dish, filling for tortillas and other bread, the meat portion of stews, and as finger-food snacks.

=== Belize ===
In Belize, chicharrón made from pork belly can be served with escabeche (onion soup). There are other variations of chicharrón in Belize made from beef skin.

=== Bolivia ===
Chicharrón is made of pork ribs seasoned with garlic, oregano and lemon. It is boiled and then cooked in its own fat, adding beer or chicha to the pot for more flavor. Pork chicharrón is normally served only on Sundays and is eaten with llajwa, a tomato salsa, and mote, a type of corn (maize). There are other variations of chicharrón made with chicken and fish.

=== Brazil and Portugal ===
In Portuguese, it is known as torresmo. The dish may be seasoned with garlic, pepper or other spices. It is cooked in its own fat or oil; the finished product is typically complemented with a wedge of lime.

=== Canada ===
Oreilles de crisse is a traditional Quebec dish consisting of deep-fried salted fatback. It is generally served in cabanes à sucre (sugar shacks) in spring time, as a "palate cleanser" between maple syrup-laden foods.

=== Chile ===
Chicharrones are made of fat, sometimes with a bit of meat, and are typically served with homemade bread.

=== Colombia ===
Chicharrón is made from deep-fried pig skin with meat attached, but it can also be made from chicken skin. In the Caribbean coast, it is eaten along with bollo de yuca, bollo limpio or boiled yuca at breakfast at home or at any time of the day at restaurants. It is eaten chopped as a stuffing in arepas. In Córdoba, it is also prepared in sancocho. It is also part of bandeja paisa, a typical dish of Antioquia.

=== Costa Rica ===
Chicharrones are made by frying pork (usually ribs) in fat, and are associated with several dishes. Most Costa Ricans eat them with rangpur or lime juice and fried yuca, accompanied by tortillas. They are also a main ingredient in a popular dish called chifrijo, which also combines red beans, rice, and pico de gallo.

=== Trinidad and Tobago ===
Chicharrón is usually eaten with tostones. It is prepared by washing and drying pork and cutting it into small pieces, which are seasoned with a mix of lemon juice and salt.

=== El Salvador ===
Pupusas are often filled with chopped chicharrón as a stuffing.

=== Guam ===
The dish is known in the local Chamorro language as chachalon, derived from the food's Spanish name.

=== Guatemala ===
Chicharrón is eaten with tortillas, lime, guacamole, and moronga sausage, and sometimes served with pico de gallo or Chirmol salsa. Also known as carnitas in Guatemala, these refer to a meatier part of the pork rind. Where a chicharrón is, strictly speaking, skin and fat, carnitas denotes skin with some meat as well. (In other places, carnitas generally refers to fried pork meat without skin or a stew-like dish made from it.)

=== Mexico ===
Besides chicharrón made from pig skin and fat, snack-food companies Barcel and Sabritas have commercialized vegetarian versions (primarily made of puffed cornmeal batter) with chile and lemon flavorings since the 1980s. Chicharrón de cerdo are also distributed by many salty snack companies in Mexico, sold in supermarkets, and made and sold by markets, tianguis, and street vendors. Tacos de chicharrón (chicharrones wrapped in a tortilla with some avocado, creamy cheese (such as queso panela, queso blanco, or queso fresco), and sometimes, hot sauce) are popular as snacks, appetizers, or a main dish. Popular dishes that make use of chicharrón as a main ingredient include chicharrón con salsa verde and gorditas de chicharrón. The North Mexico version is made with fried pork belly (and has more meat, compared to the South Mexico version), and is more based on Spanish torreznos.

=== Peru ===
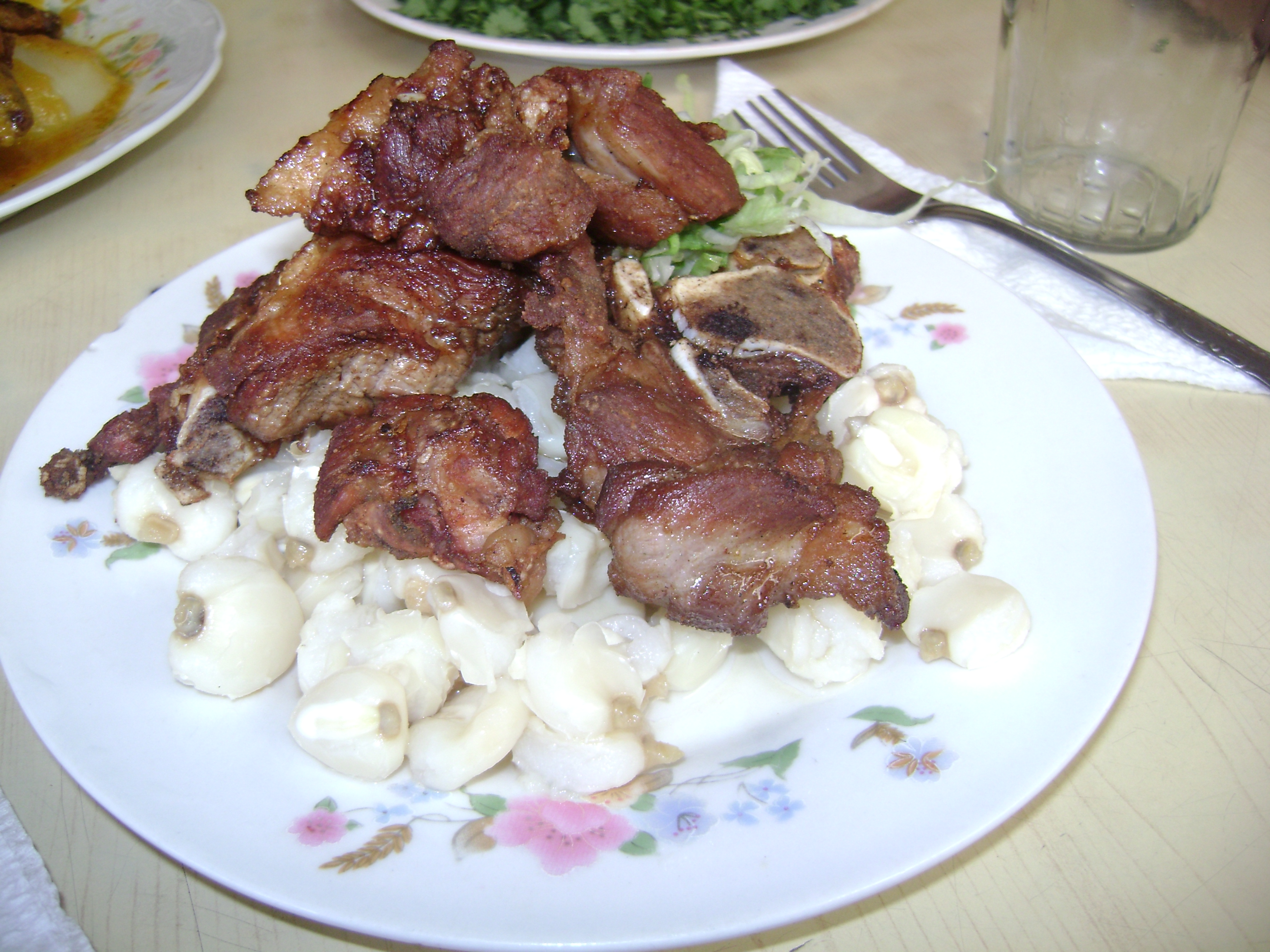
Chicharrón from the Ancash Region of Peru

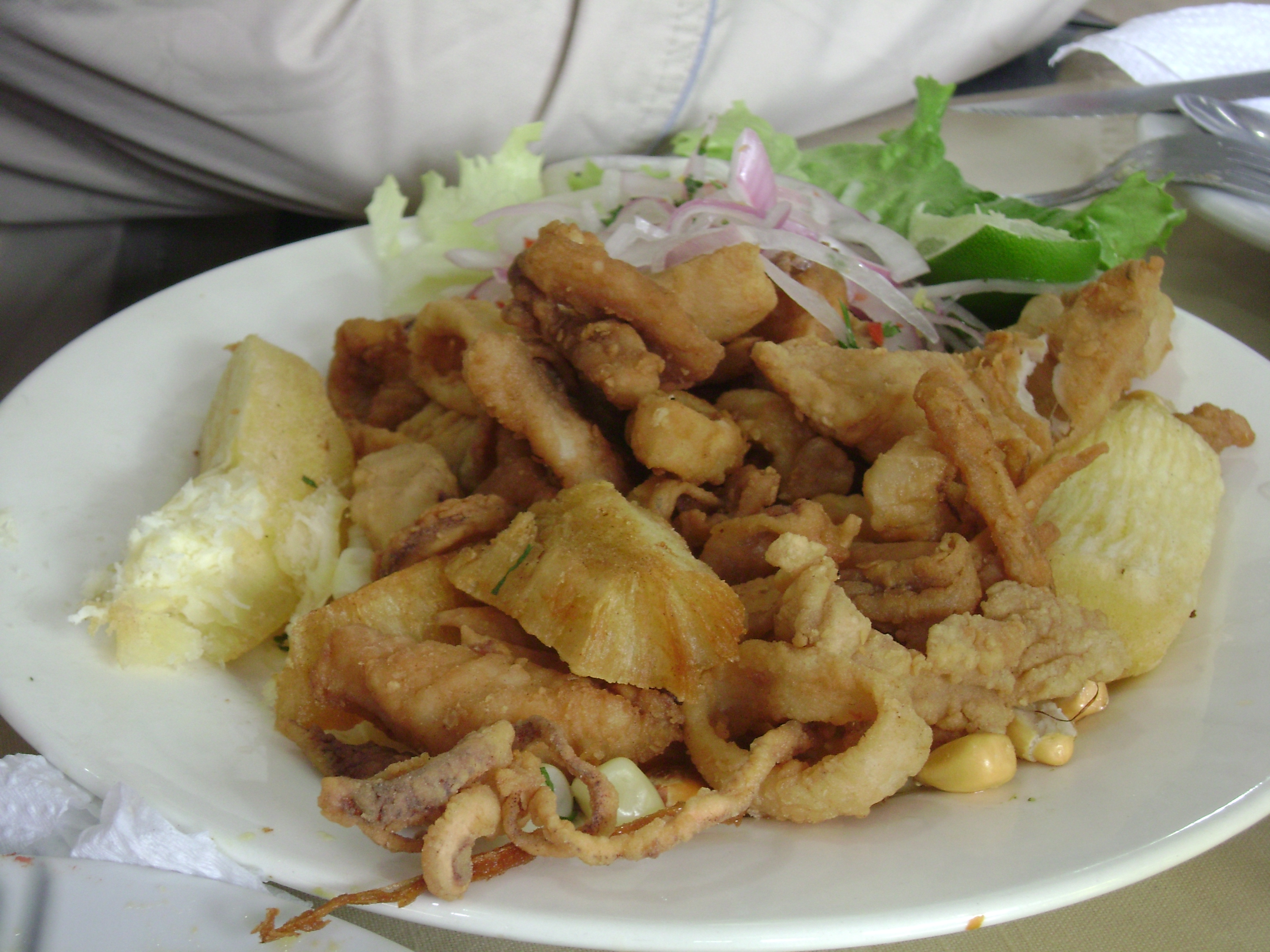
Mixed seafood Chicharrón, as served in Peru

Chicharrón in Peru is made using what is called "country-style pork rib" in the United States. The rind (skin and attached fat) is not used at all; instead, the meat is boiled with seasonings and spices until no water remains and then fried in its own fat. It is often served as a breakfast or brunch food on a baguette with a relish made from red onion and lime juice. Chicharrón can be eaten as an appetizer or snack, and the chicken variant can taste like fried chicken found in the United States. Side dishes include a kind of red onion relish, fried yuca, and other regional variants. Chicharrón can also be prepared with fish rather than pork.

=== Philippines ===
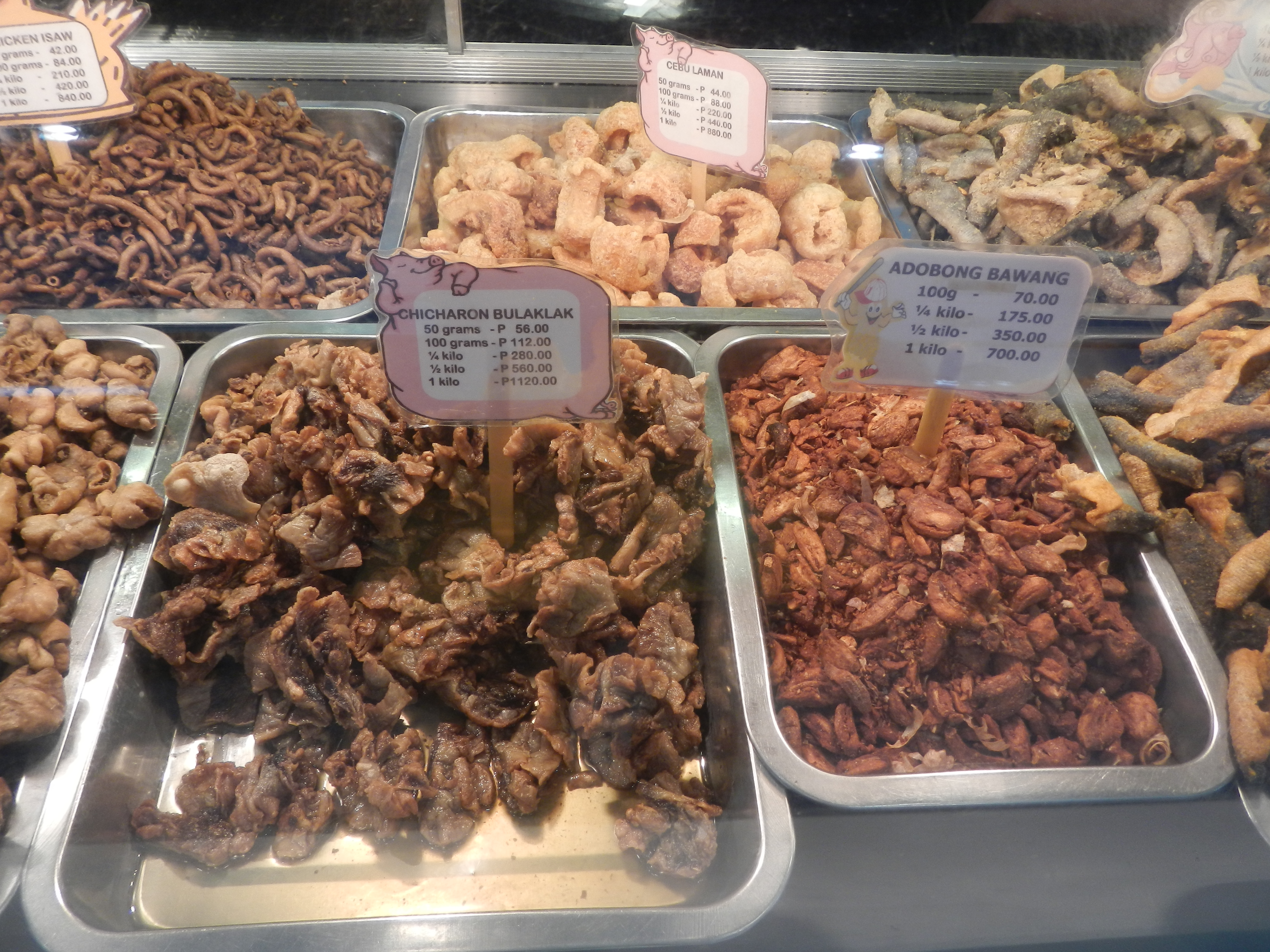
Various types of chicharon from the Philippines, including pork rind, chicken intestine, pork offal, and tuna skin

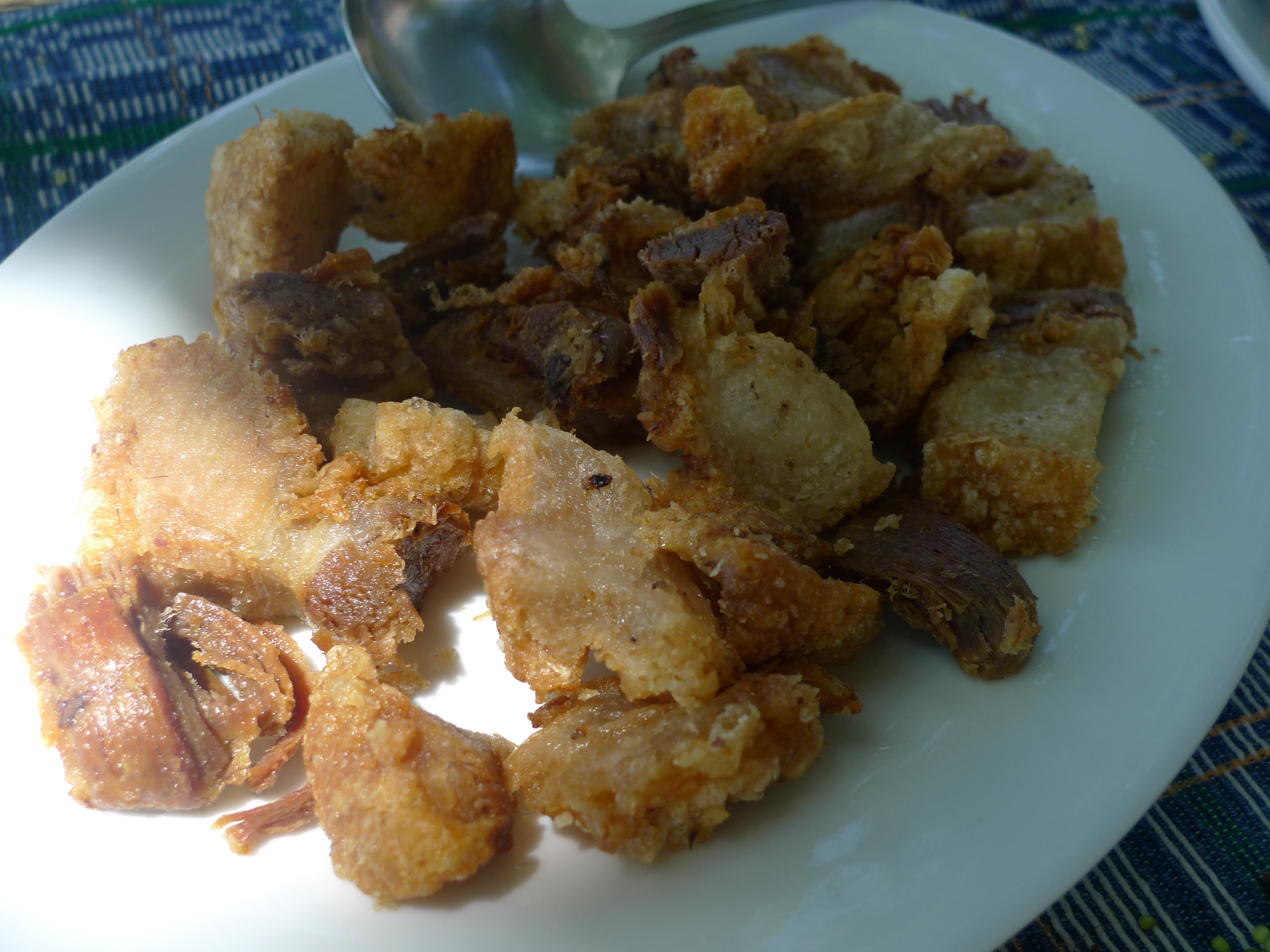
Bagnet from Ilocos Norte, Philippines

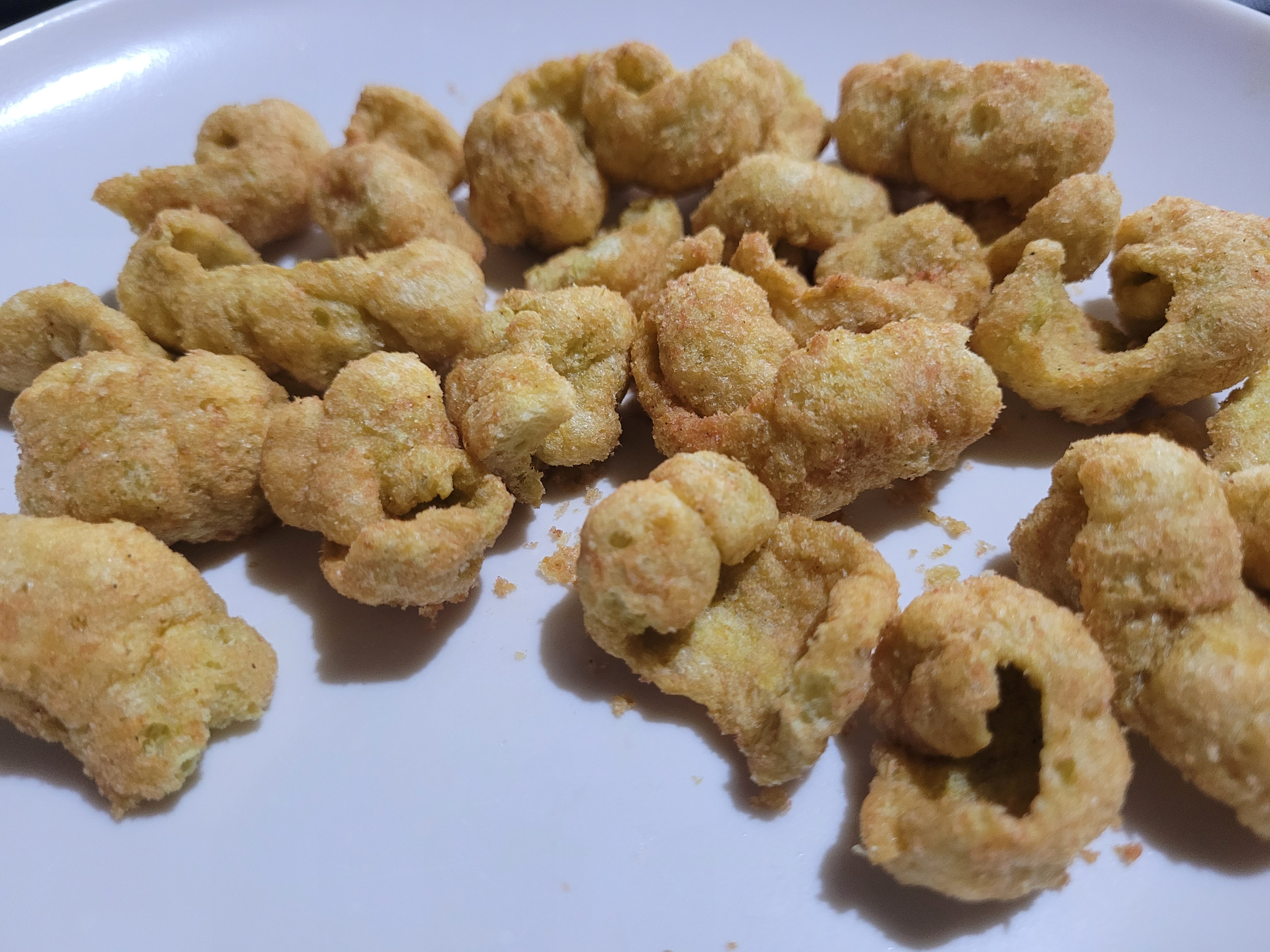
Vegan chicharon from the Philippines, made with mushroom, potato, carrot, and tapioca starch

Chicharon, less commonly spelled tsitsaron or sitsaron, is ubiquitous, as it is a well-loved snack, and may be bought anywhere, from large supermarket chains to small neighborhood sari-sari stores and street vendors. It is popular as pulutan or tapas which are foods to be eaten while consuming alcoholic beverages such as beer. It is also used as a topping on many native vegetable and noodle dishes. Pork chicharon is prepared by deep-frying dried pork rind with a little salt. It may be dipped in coconut vinegar spiced with soy sauce, chopped garlic and labuyo chili peppers, or eaten with other condiments like bagoong anchovies, lechon gravy sauce, or atchara papaya salad.

Aside from pork rind, chicken skin may also be made into chicharong manok, whereas chicharong bulaklak—literally 'flower chicharrón', named for its distinctive shape—is made from pork mesentery.

Tuna-skin chicharon is marketed as a healthier variation. In Cagayan, water buffalo hide is used to make carabao chicharon.

A distinct variant of chicharon involves cooking pork loin and meat in the same way, becoming bagnet. While similar and dissimilar to crispy pata, it is more popular as a meal than finger food, and has found its way to contemporary dishes and restaurants. Bagnet originates from Ilocos where it has been served since the 1960s.

Fully vegan versions of chicharon are also made in the Philippines using deep-fried tofu skin, mushrooms, seaweed, starch, and other plant-based ingredients. Commercial chips like Chicharron ni Mang Juan and Marty's Cracklin' are also vegan, with the exception of a few flavors.

=== Puerto Rico ===
Mofongo is a popular dish in which green plantains, cassava, or breadfruit are fried then mashed with chicharrón and other ingredients. Chuleta kan-kan is found in Puerto Rican fondas, using a pork chop (chuleta) with rib, fat, and skin still attached, then marinated. Chuleta kan-kan is deep-fried, forming chicharrónes of crispy skin attached to the rib and pork-chop meat. The city of Bayamón – nicknamed the "city of chicharrón" – is famous for the chicharrón produced locally, as is the Guavate barrio in the city of Cayey. Chicharrón is a popular ingredient in Puerto Rican rice with added sofrito, pigeon peas, spices and other ingredients. Rusiao de yuca like pasteles are made from grated cassava that has been dehydrated, toasted, then notably rehydrated with coconut milk into masa and seasoned with anise, mashed or finely chopped chicharrón, oregano among other ingredients. They are then wrapped in banana leaf and grilled.

=== Serbia ===
In Serbia, they are called čvarci. Usually made during the slaughter of pigs for the winter. Usually cooked with milk and lard to give them a nice gold color after they have been pressed through a pressure sift to make them have the texture of chips.

=== United States ===
US-style pork rinds are usually made from pig skin and fat without meat. They are commonly seasoned and sold in plastic bags, like corn and potato chips as a "junk food" item. Some brands in the Southwest use the Spanish term chicharrones, and Mexican-style chicharrón dishes are available in many Mexican and Southwestern restaurants in the region. In the Deep South, traditional home-cooked pork rinds are called cracklings or (colloquially) cracklins. They are made in a two-step process: the pork skin is first rendered and dried, and then fried and puffed.

In New Mexico, the term is often taken to mean just fried pork fat, sometimes with incidental bits of lean meat. Similar to the Mexican chicharrón, its use in New Mexican cuisine is most commonly in bean burritos with chopped New Mexico chile. It is colloquially prepared by frying in a disco, a wok-like pan made from a repurposed tractor disc blade.

=== Uruguay ===
Chicharrones are a byproduct of tallow making in Uruguay. Usually extracted from the softest fat of the cow located on the kidneys, this fat is known as grasa de pella. The pella is heated until melt and the solid residue are the chicharrones. Chicharrones are traditionally used as additive for a typical bread called rosca de chicharrones.

=== Venezuela ===
In central Venezuela, chicharrones are eaten with cachapas and also commonly sold alongside main highways as snacks. The recipe usually produces crispy sizable portions of pork skin with the underlying meat. The cueritos type are also made with pork skin and marinated in vinegar instead of deep fried. They are eaten as a snack.

=== Other countries ===
Pork rind is also eaten in many other countries in forms unrelated to the chicharrón tradition. For example, in Denmark, flæskesvær is pork skin deep-fried with or without a layer of fat. It is usually eaten as a snack, like crisps (chips) or popcorn. At Christmas-time it is also traditional to eat fried strips of pork belly the skin on, with or without meat in addition to fat.

In the countryside in Greece, during Christmas time people prepare tsigarídes which is deep fried pork belly skin.

In the United Kingdom, pork rinds are called pork scratchings. They are a popular snack sold in pubs and bars, packaged in small plastic bags like potato crisps.

== Similar foods ==
- Duros, also known as chicharrones
- Lechon kawali
- Philippine cuisine
- Torreznos
- Tocino
- Siu yuk

== See also ==
- Latin American cuisine
- List of pork dishes
- Pig farming
