= Andok's =

Filipino fast food restaurant chain

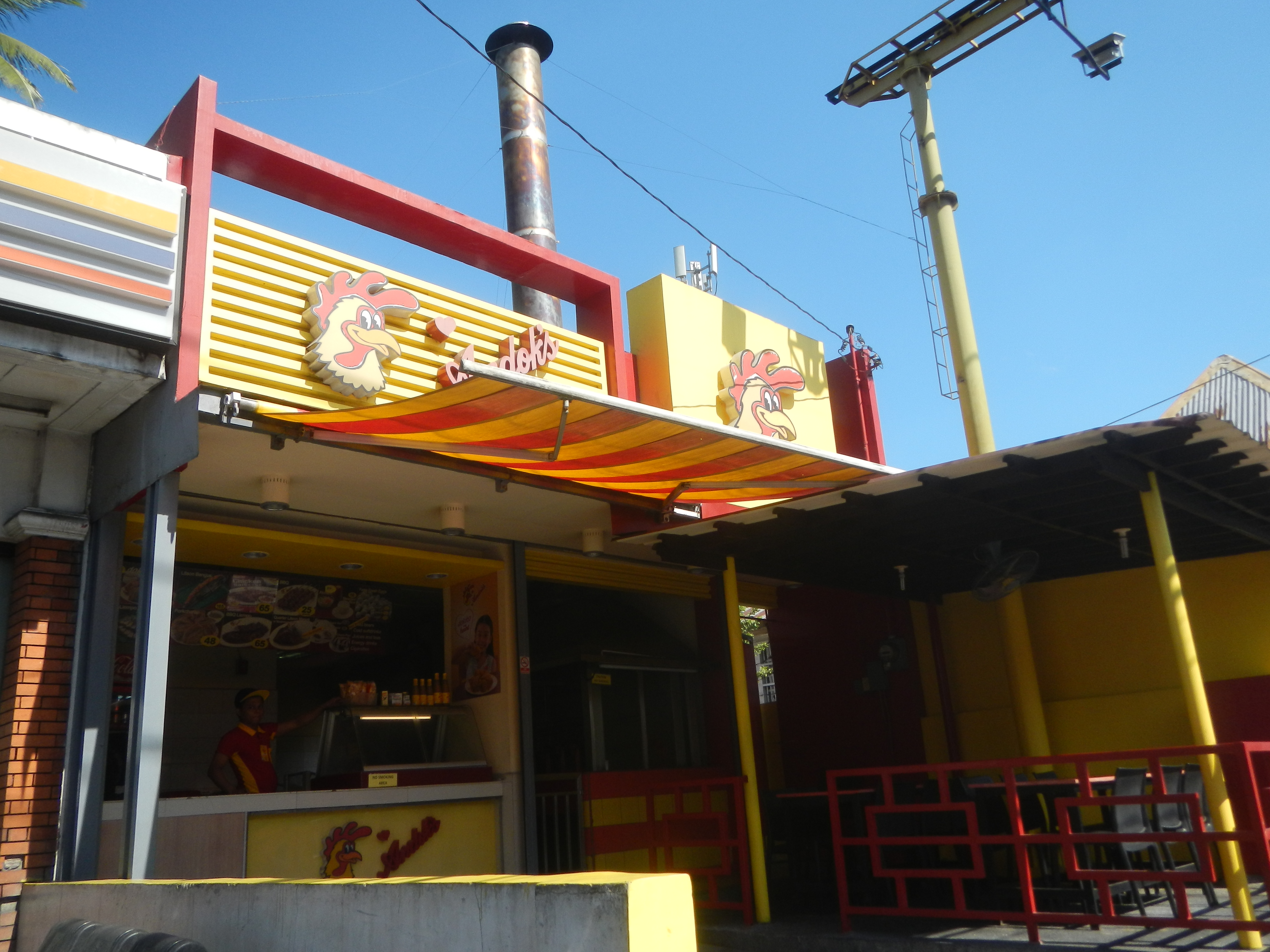
- An Andok's outlet in Santa Rosa, Laguna
- Product type: Fast food chain
- Current owner: Javier Family / Andok's Litson Corporation
- Country: Philippines
- Introduced: December 11, 1985; 40 years ago
- Markets: Philippines, Singapore
- Ambassador: Piolo Pascual (since 2019)
- Tagline: "Pambansang Litson Manok" ("Nation's Roasted Chicken")
- Website: www.andoks.com.ph
- Founder: Sandy Javier
- Headquarters: Quezon City, Metro Manila, Philippines
- Number of locations: (circa 2010s)
- Key people: Sandy Javier (CEO); Maverick Javier (Executive Vice President)

Andok's Litson Corporation, doing business as Andok's, is a Filipino fast food chain recognized for its lechon manok (Filipino spit-roasted chicken). The company was founded in December 1985 by Leonardo "Sandy" Javier Jr., who opened the first Andok's stall on West Avenue in Quezon City.

== History ==
=== Early years ===
Andok's was founded by Sandy Javier, a businessman who later served as the mayor of Javier, Leyte. The first Andok's stall opened on December 11, 1985, on West Avenue in Quezon City.

Javier reportedly decided to start the business after observing lechon manok vendors in Pampanga and believing he could improve upon their preparation methods, which he perceived as too rushed. The initial recipe for Andok's lechon manok was developed with customer feedback during its first year and has, according to the company, remained largely unchanged.

The business faced difficulties at its inception. Javier borrowed 12 chicks for his first day, selling only two. Early promotional efforts included mentioning his Ateneo background and his relation to his brother, Danny Javier of the Apo Hiking Society. A distinctive yellow plywood signage was also used to attract attention and became a recognized feature of the brand. Eventually, the West Avenue stall's daily sales grew to approximately 80 chickens.

The name "Andok's" was chosen by Sandy Javier Jr. as a tribute to his father, Leonardo Sr., who was known by the nickname "Andok." Javier made a promise to his dying father to name his business after him.

=== Expansion and diversification ===
Andok's subsequently expanded its operations. In 2002, the company entered the Visayas market by opening two stores in Cebu, adding nine more in the region within the following two years. The first Andok's dine-in restaurant was established in D'Mall, Boracay; its positive reception led to the opening of five more outlets on the island in less than a year. By the early 2010s, Andok's had numerous outlets across the Philippines.

To broaden its appeal and mitigate risks associated with a single-product focus, Javier diversified the menu. This led to the introduction of Litson Liempo (grilled pork belly). In 2004, Andok's launched Dokito Frito, its brand of fried chicken, which became a popular addition to its offerings. The product line continued to grow with items such as Litson Bangus (roasted milkfish), Porkcharap (fried pork chop), and Pork Barbecue.

In July 2019, Andok's introduced a Spicy Dokito fried chicken variant and engaged actor Piolo Pascual as its first celebrity brand ambassador.

== Regulatory issues ==
In 2021 and 2024 the Philippine Food and Drug Administration issued public advisories warning consumers about unregistered products bearing the Andok's name, including a bottled sauce and other branded items. These advisories warned the public against purchasing or consuming the unregistered products and asked retailers to cease distribution until registration and corrective actions were completed.

=== International expansion ===
Andok's commenced international operations with the opening of its first overseas outlet in Lucky Plaza, Singapore, in January 2025. This expansion was reported to be spearheaded by Javier's family, including his daughter Mica Javier. The company had previously indicated potential plans in 2019 for expansion into markets including the United States, United Kingdom, and the United Arab Emirates.

== Products ==
Andok's is widely known for its litson manok (roasted chicken), but later increased its offerings to include litson bangus (roasted milkfish) and other meat products. Andok's litson baka (roasted calf) trended on social media in 2021.

== Branding and marketing ==
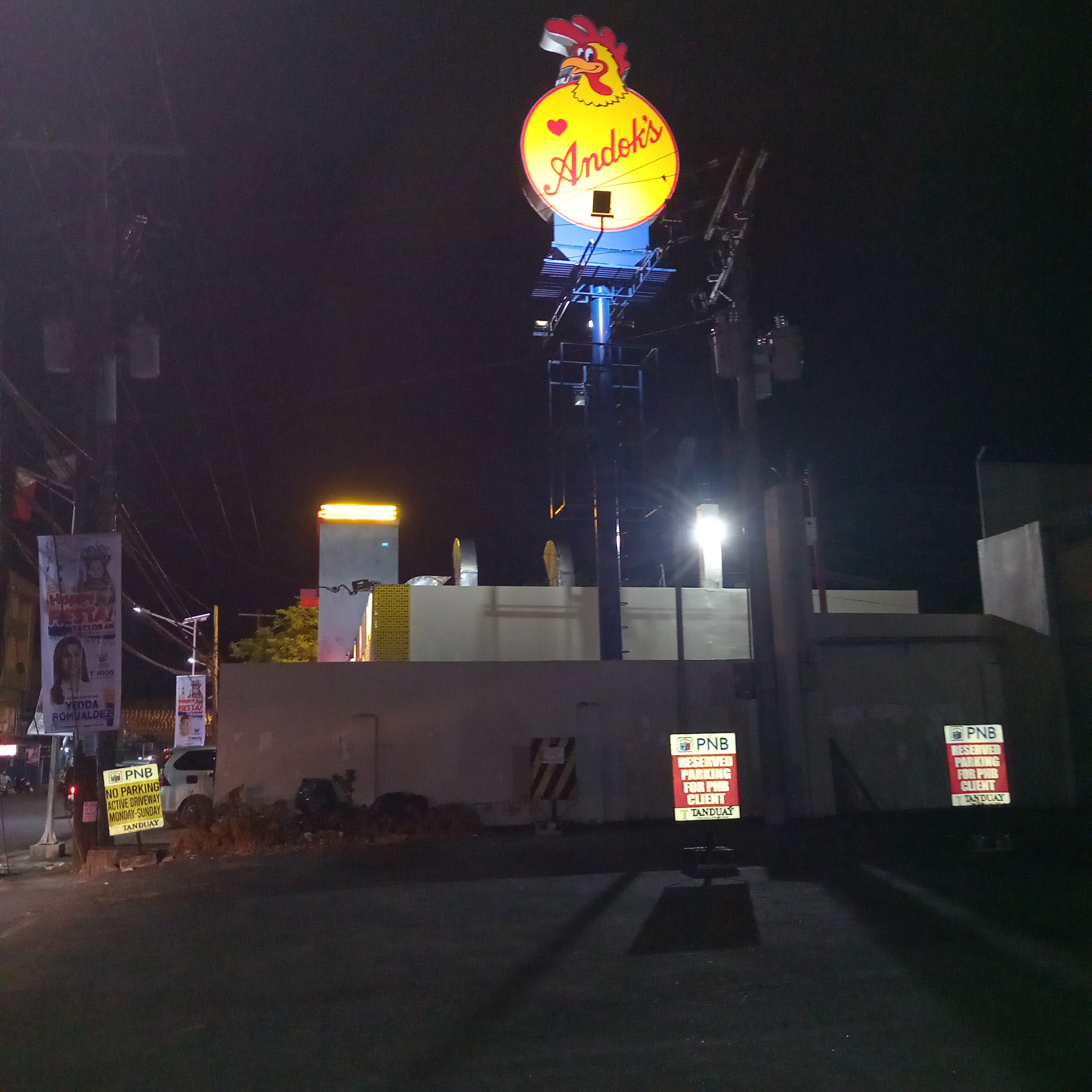
Exterior signage of an Andok's outlet at night, showing the brand's yellow and red color scheme.

Andok's uses a bright yellow and red color scheme in its stalls, packaging, and promotional materials. The brand uses the tagline, "Pambansang Litson Manok" ("Nation's Roasted Chicken").

Many Andok's outlets operate as take-out counters, with some locations also offering dine-in facilities. Stores are commonly located in markets, transport terminals, and along major roads. In 2019, Andok's appointed actor Piolo Pascual as its first celebrity brand ambassador, coinciding with the launch of its Spicy Dokito fried chicken product.

== See also ==
- Baliwag Lechon Manok
- Chooks-to-Go
- Filipino cuisine
- List of fast-food chicken restaurants
- Mang Inasal
