= Inihaw =

Barbecue dishes from the Philippines

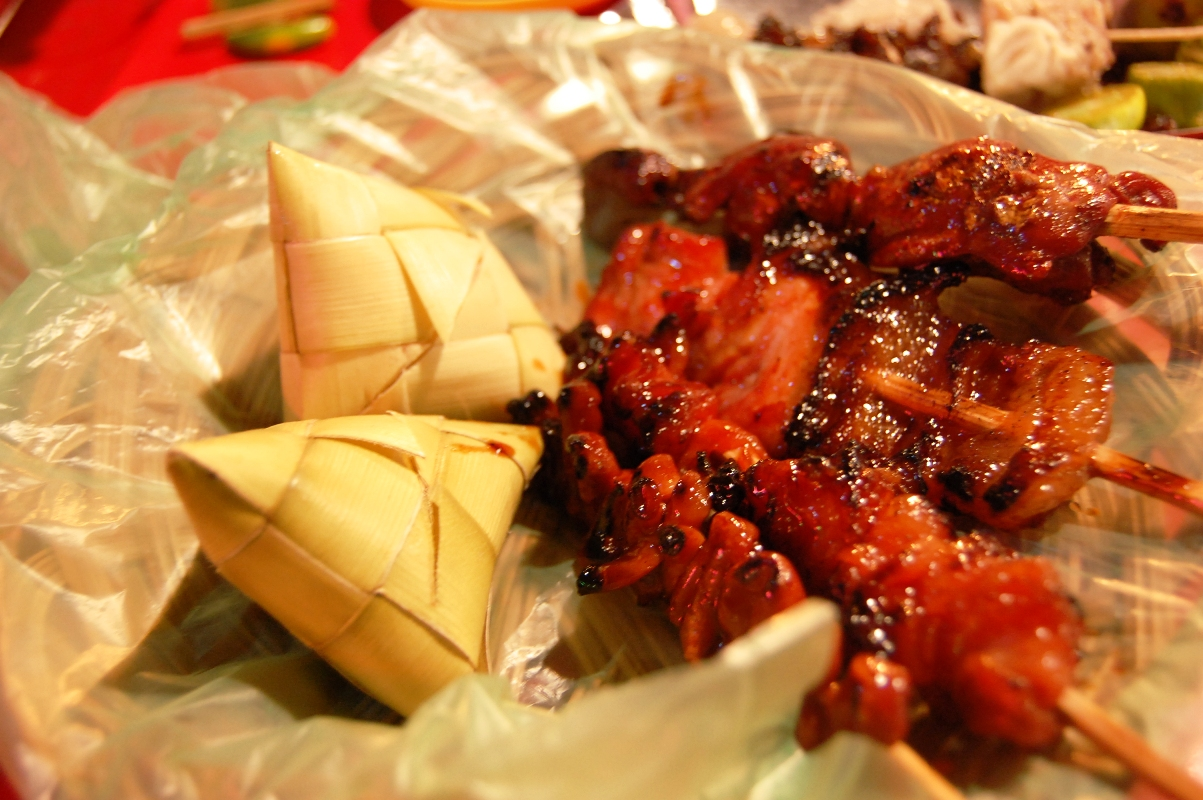
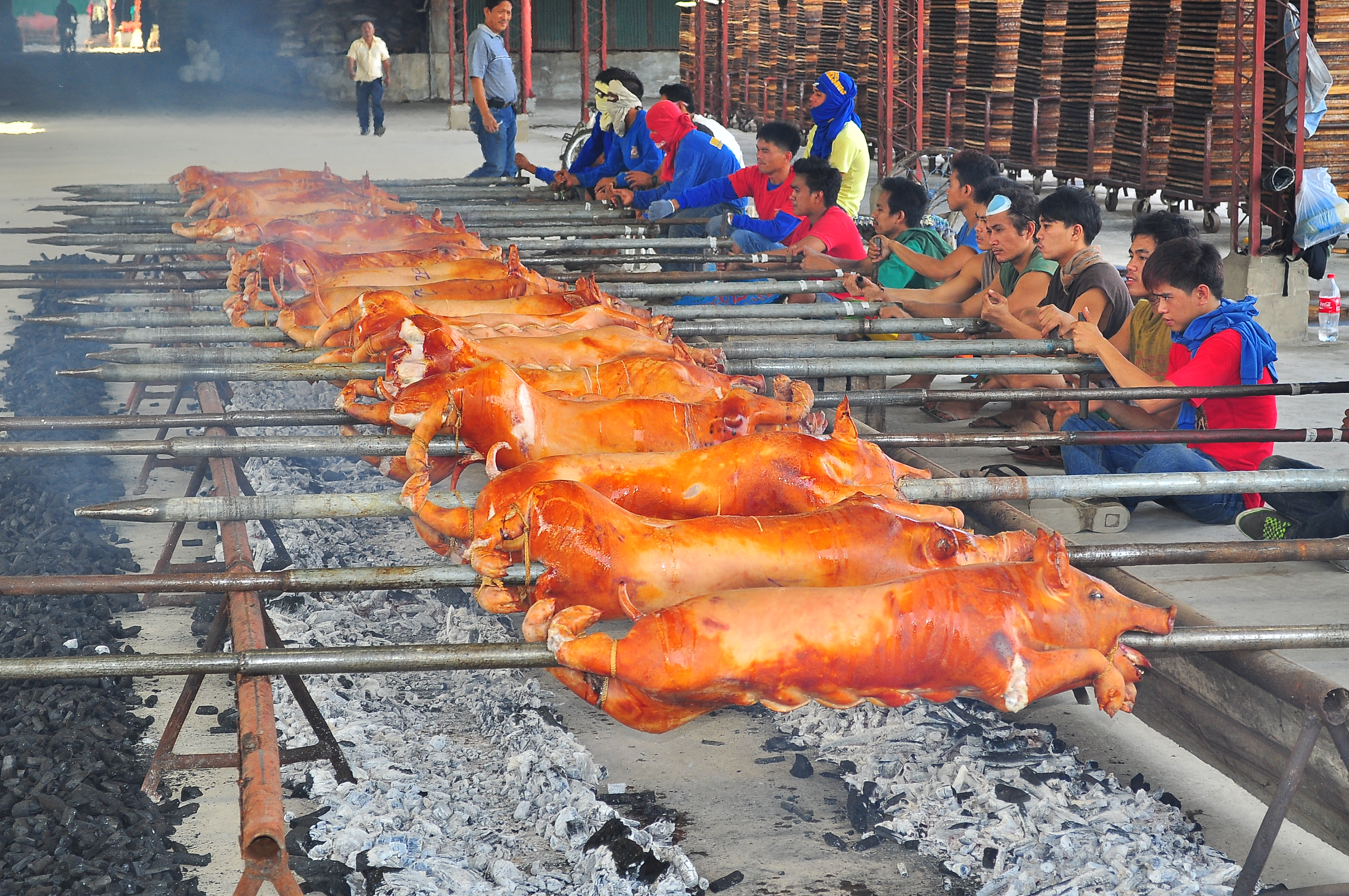
- Top: Various inihaw on skewers with pusô Bottom: Lechon (inihaw na baboy) being roasted over coals
- Alternative names: Sinugba, Inasal, Ihaw-ihaw, Sugba-sugba, Filipino barbecue, Pinoy BBQ
- Place of origin: Philippines
- Similar dishes: Inasal, Lechon manok, Satti, Satay

Inihaw (pronounced [ɪˈni:haʊ] ee-NEE-how), also known as sinugba or inasal, are various types of grilled or spit-roasted barbecue dishes from the Philippines. They are usually made from pork or chicken and are served on bamboo skewers or in small cubes with a soy sauce and vinegar-based dip. The term can also refer to any meat or seafood dish cooked and served in a similar way. Inihaw are commonly sold as street food and are eaten with white rice or rice cooked in coconut leaves (pusô). Inihaw is also commonly referred to as Filipino barbecue or (informally) Pinoy BBQ.

== Description ==
Inihaw is a general term simply meaning "grilled" or "roasted" in Tagalog, from the verb ihaw ("to grill"). It is also known as sinugba (verb sugba, "to grill") in Cebuano, and inasal (verb asal, "to roast in dry heat, to skewer") in both Cebuano and Hiligaynon. It may also be referred to simply by the English name "barbecue" (usually shortened to "BBQ"), especially for inihaw served in skewers. In other languages of the Philippines, inihaw is known as nangnang or ningnang in Kapampangan, tinúno in Ilocano, and inkalot in Pangasinense, among others.

Inihaw are usually made with pork, chicken, beef, or seafood. Cheap versions can also be made with offal.

There are two general types of inihaw. The first are simply meat or seafood grilled directly over charcoal. They are characterized by a charred smoky exterior while remaining moist on the inside. They are usually cubed before serving, and are dipped in various sauces made with a mixture of soy sauce (or salt) and vinegar with red onions, labuyo chilis, calamansi, tomatoes, ground black pepper, and/or sugar. The second type of inihaw are meat or seafood dishes cooked and/or served on a skewer. These include whole roasted animals or cubed meat. Both types may be marinated before cooking and may also be basted while cooking.

The marinating sauce is usually similar to the sauce used for dipping. In skewered inihaw, they are also commonly marinated or basted in a sweet sauce which uses banana ketchup and annatto (achuete) oil which turns them a bright red or orange color. More southern versions known as satti are also served with a peanut-based sauce, similar to satay.

In Visayan-speaking regions, a common combination is "sinuglaw", which combines pork inihaw (sinugba) and kinilaw (raw cubed fish in vinegar and citrus juices).

== Variations ==
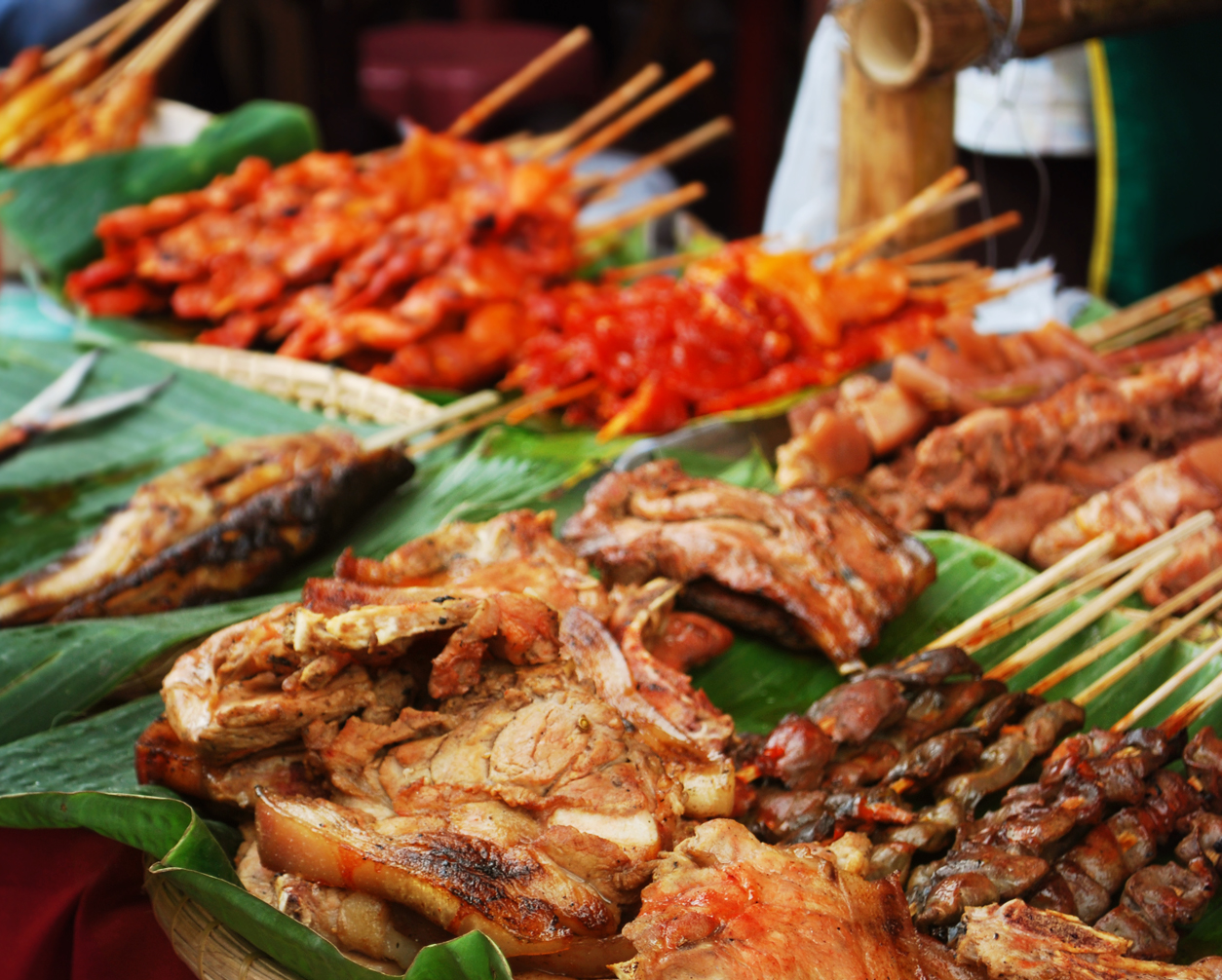
Various types of inihaw at the Dinagyang Festival

Dishes which are types of inihaw but commonly considered to be distinct include the following:

- Lechón (sometimes specified as "lechon baboy") – spit-roasted whole pig, usually stuffed with spices and lemongrass.
- Chicken inasal – a version of lechon manok from the Western Visayas, chicken marinated in a mixture of calamansi, pepper, coconut vinegar and annatto, then grilled over hot coals while basted with the marinade. It is served with rice, calamansi, soy sauce, chicken oil and vinegar (often sinamak vinegar, a palm vinegar infused with garlic, chili peppers and langkawas).
- Lechon baka - whole cow slowly spit-roasted over hot coals. The term may also apply to roast beef in general, even when only using specific cuts.
- Lechon manok – spit-roasted chicken dish made with chicken marinated in a mixture of garlic, bay leaf, onion, black pepper, soy sauce, and patis (fish sauce). The marinade may also be sweetened with muscovado or brown sugar. It is stuffed with tanglad (lemongrass) and roasted over charcoal. It is typically eaten dipped in a toyomansi or silimansi mixture of soy sauce, calamansi, and labuyo chilis. It is paired with white rice or puso and commonly served with atchara pickles as a side dish. It is a very popular dish in the Philippines and is readily available at roadside restaurants.
- Satti – are usually grilled beef or chicken served on skewers from Mindanao. It is related to the satay and sate of Indonesia and Malaysia. They are usually eaten with ta'mu (rice cooked in coconut leaves, pusô in other Philippine languages) and a bowlful of warm sauce which is usually peanut-based.
- Isaw – a term for intestines as food, often used to mean specifically a type of very cheap skewered inihaw made from pig or chicken intestines. They are cooked and eaten in the same way as meat inihaw. Other types of offal-based inihaw are also eaten, usually with humorous names due to their crude resemblance to various everyday objects. They include "walkman" (pig's ears), "betamax" (cubes of pork or chicken blood), "helmet" (chicken head), and "adidas" (chicken feet).

== Gallery ==
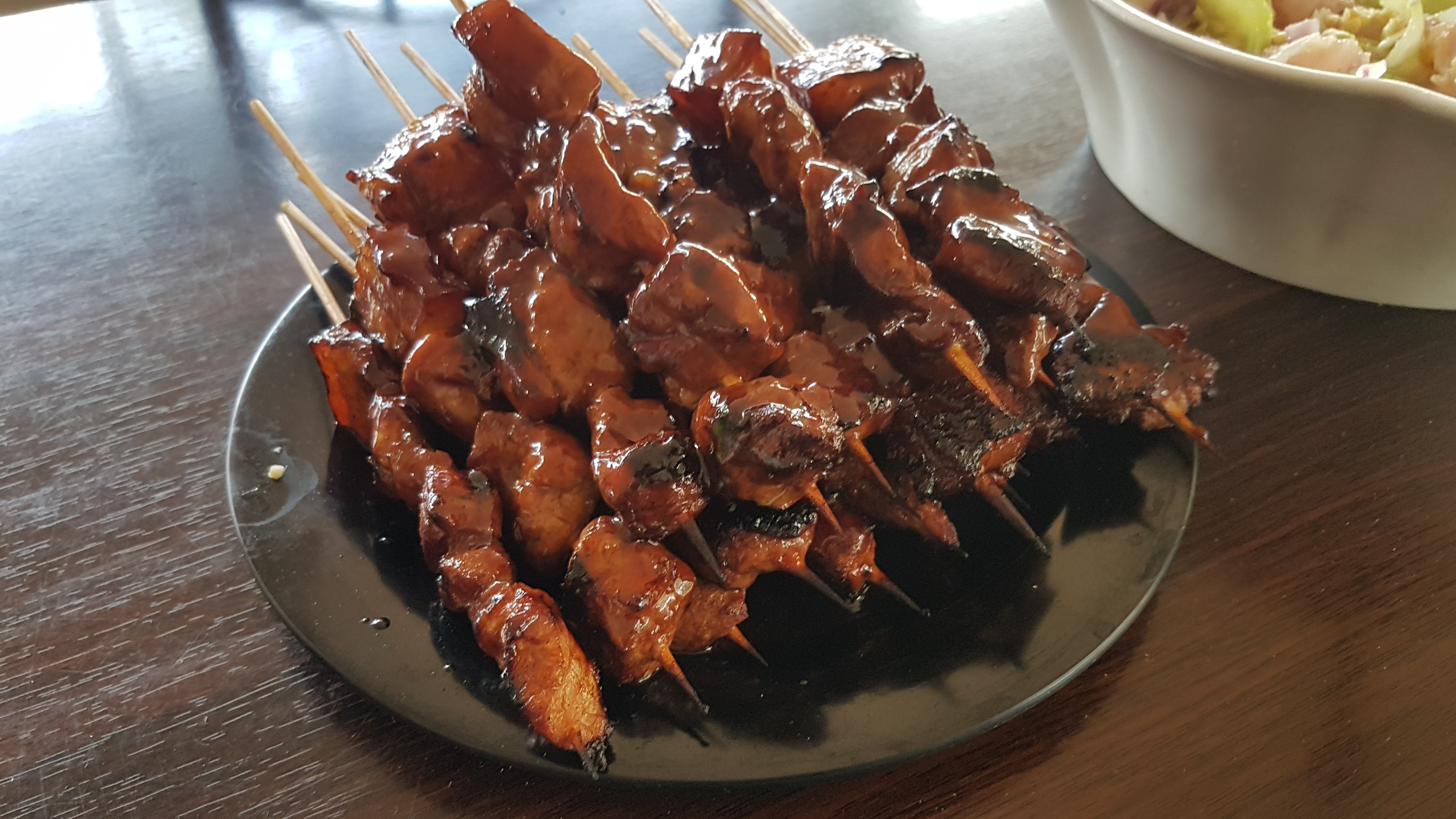
Inihaw na baboy (pork)

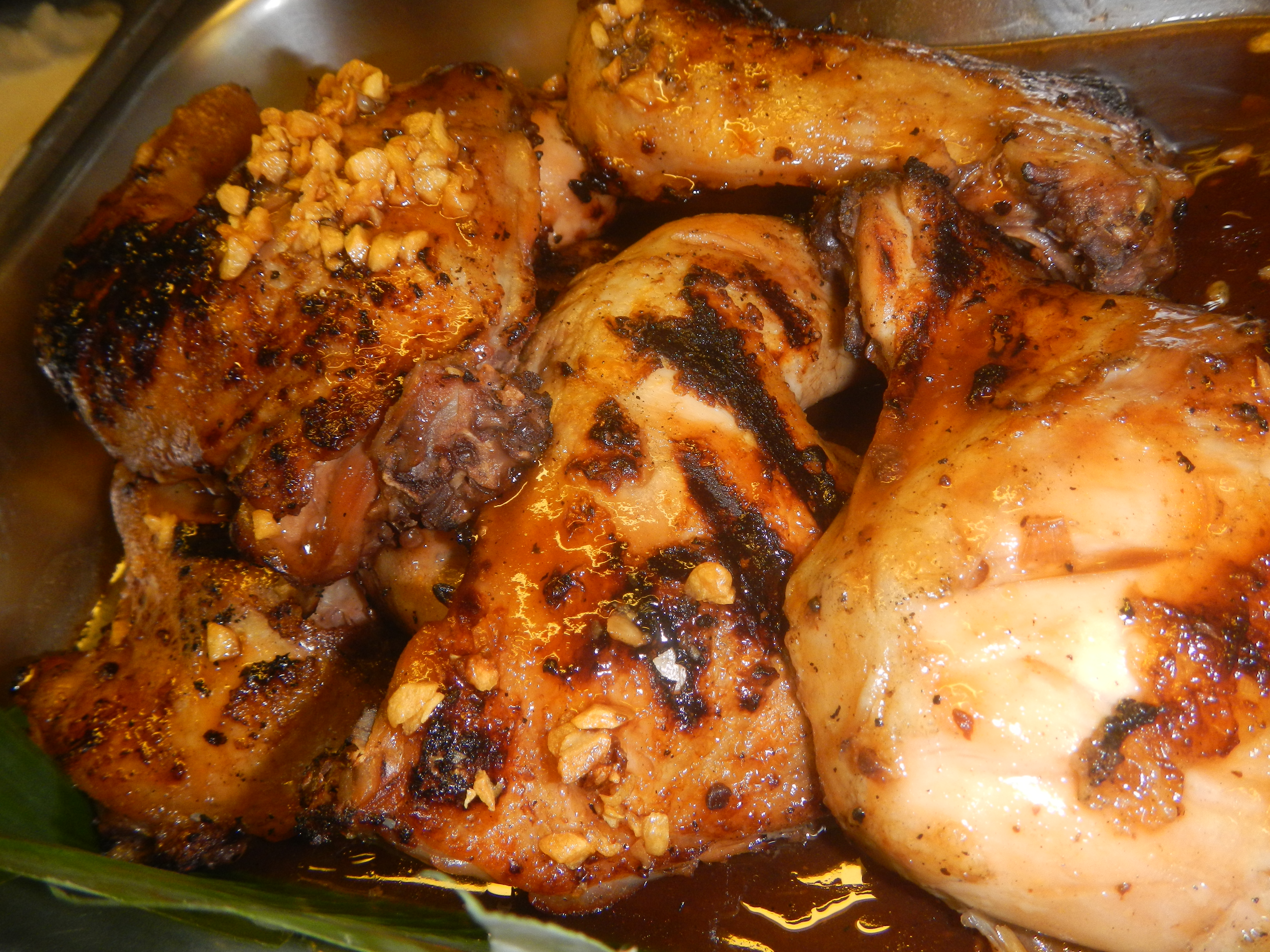
Inihaw na manok (chicken)

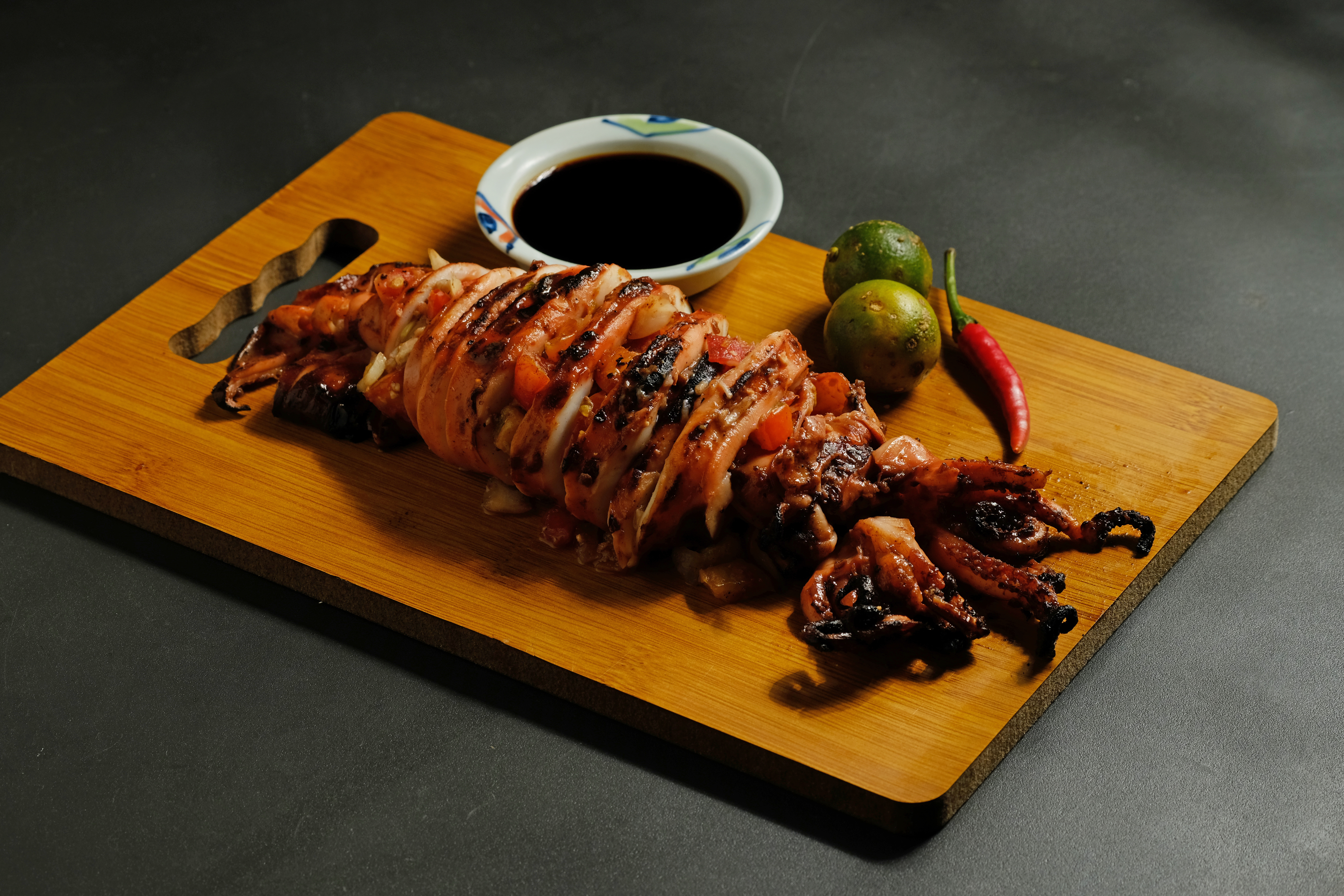
Inihaw na pusit (squid)

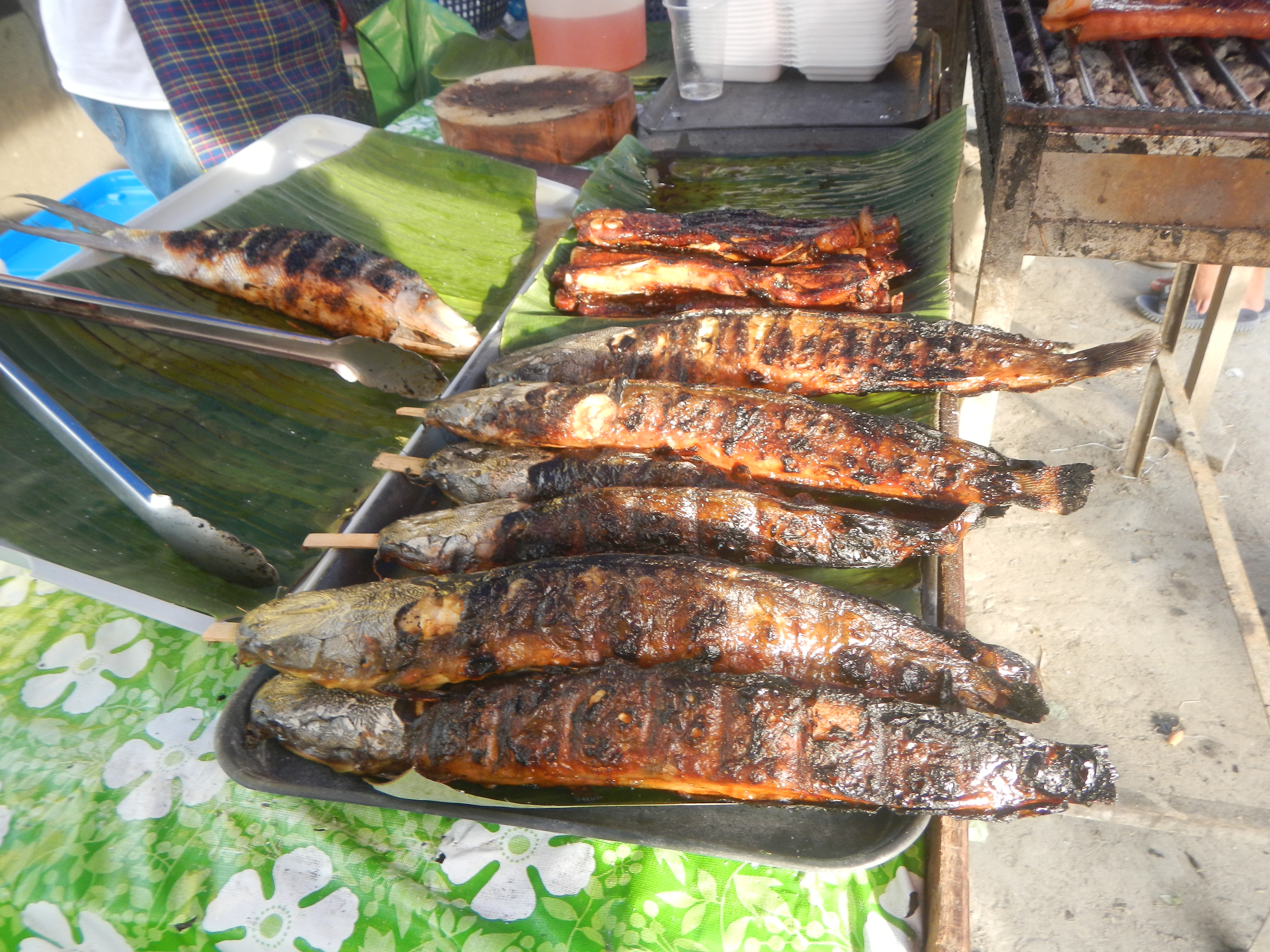
Inihaw na bangus (milkfish)

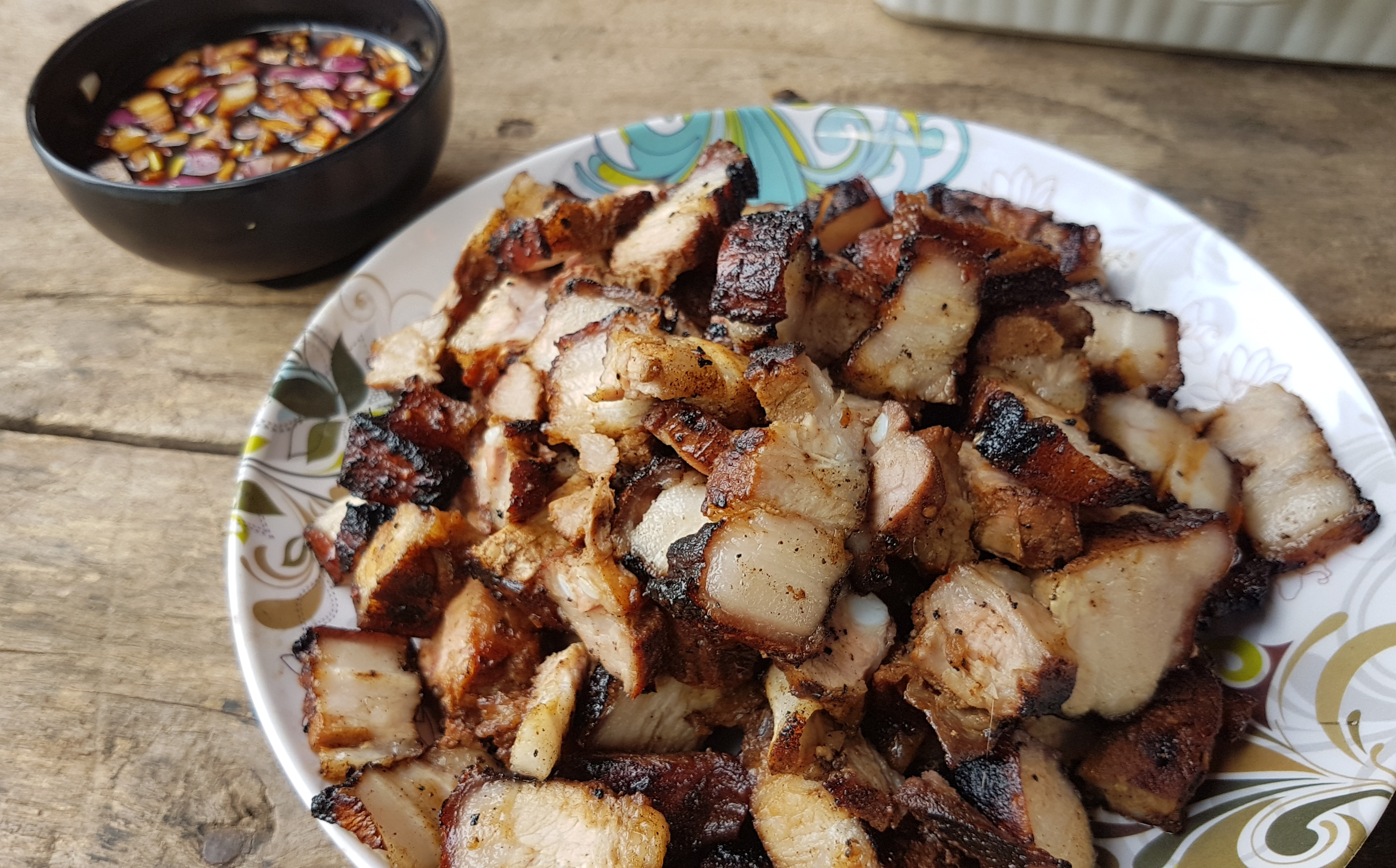
Inihaw na liempo (pork belly) with dipping sauce

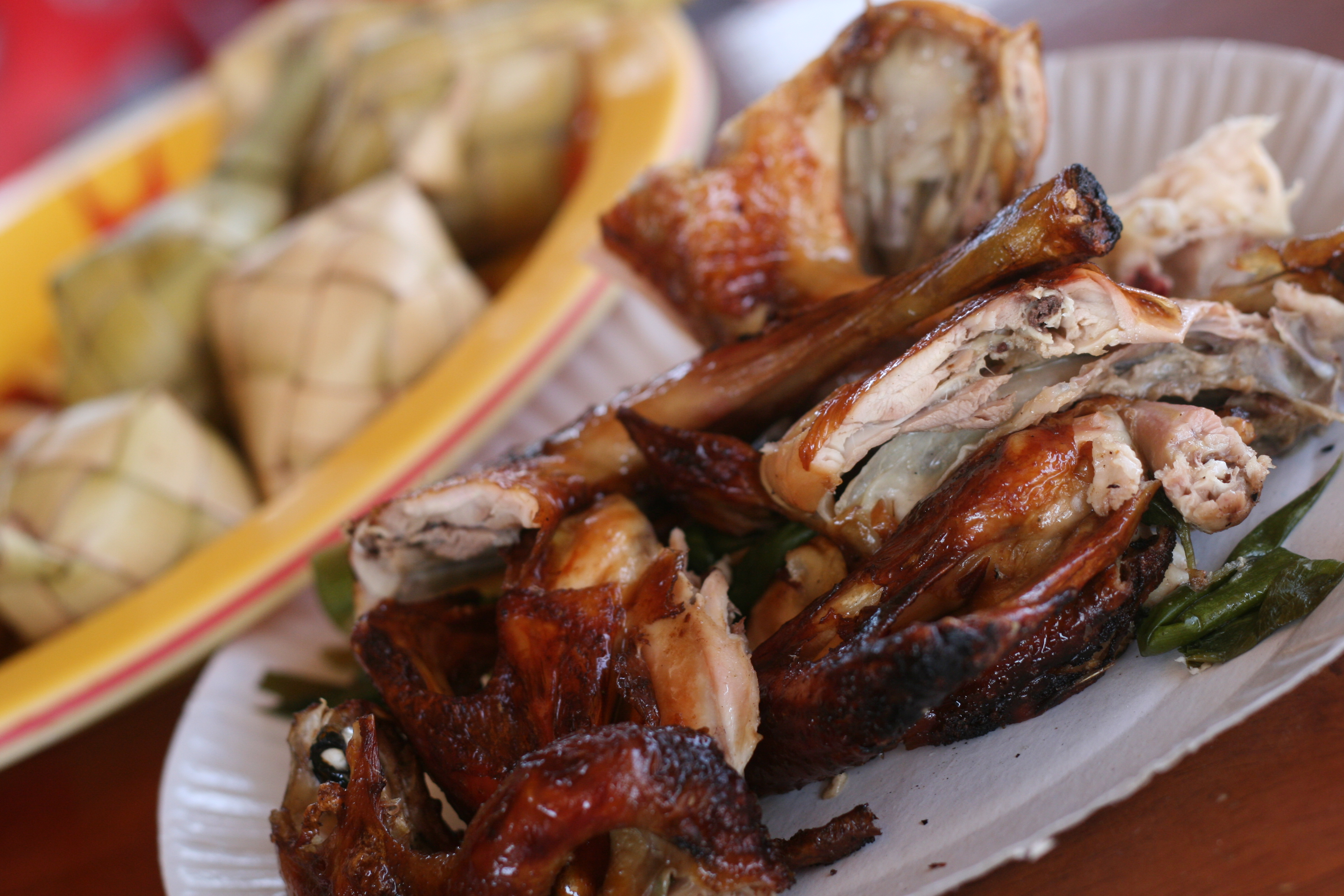
Lechon manok served with pusô

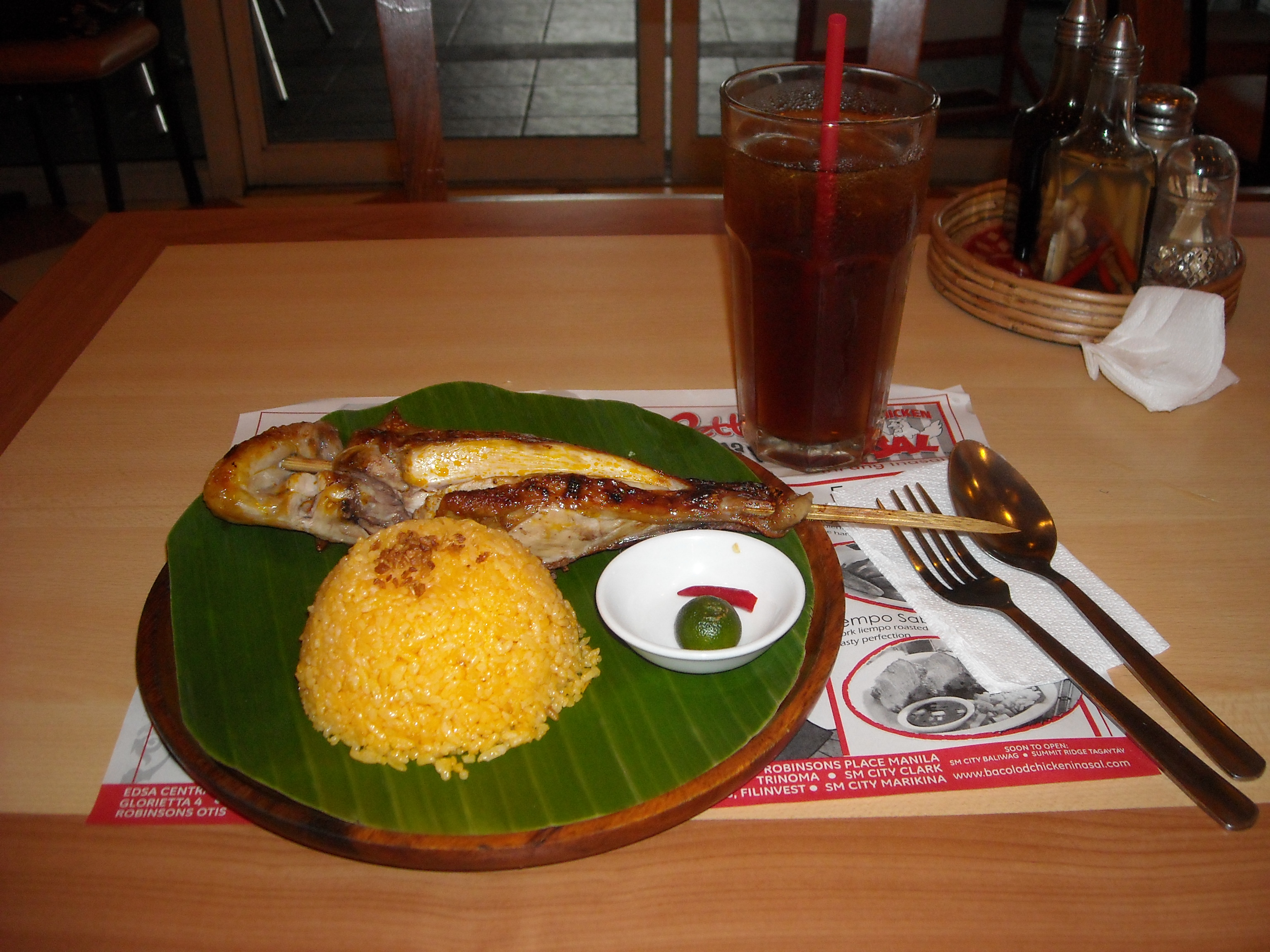
Chicken inasal

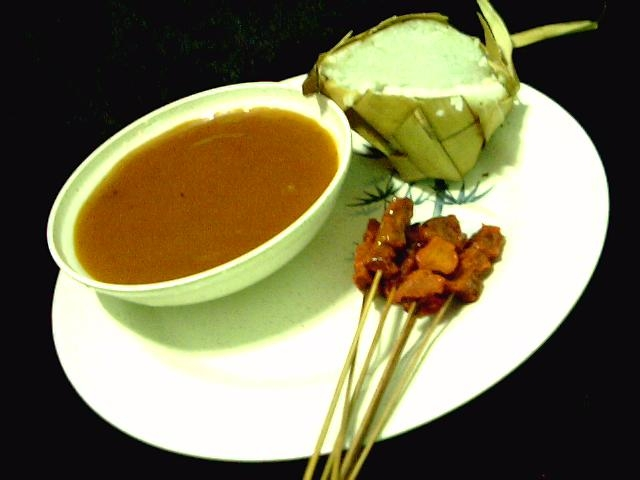
Satti served with ta'mu

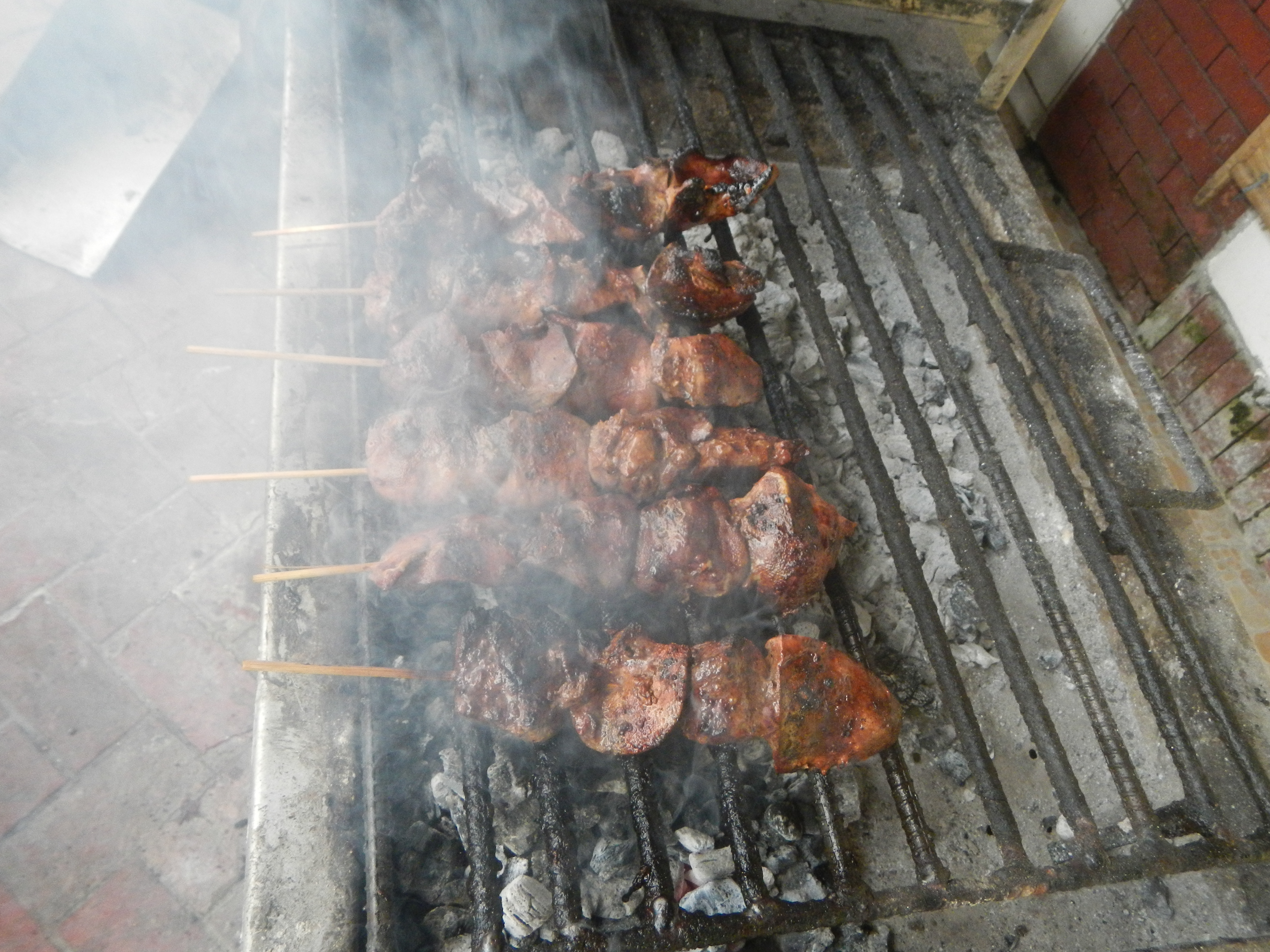
Inihaw na atay (pork liver)

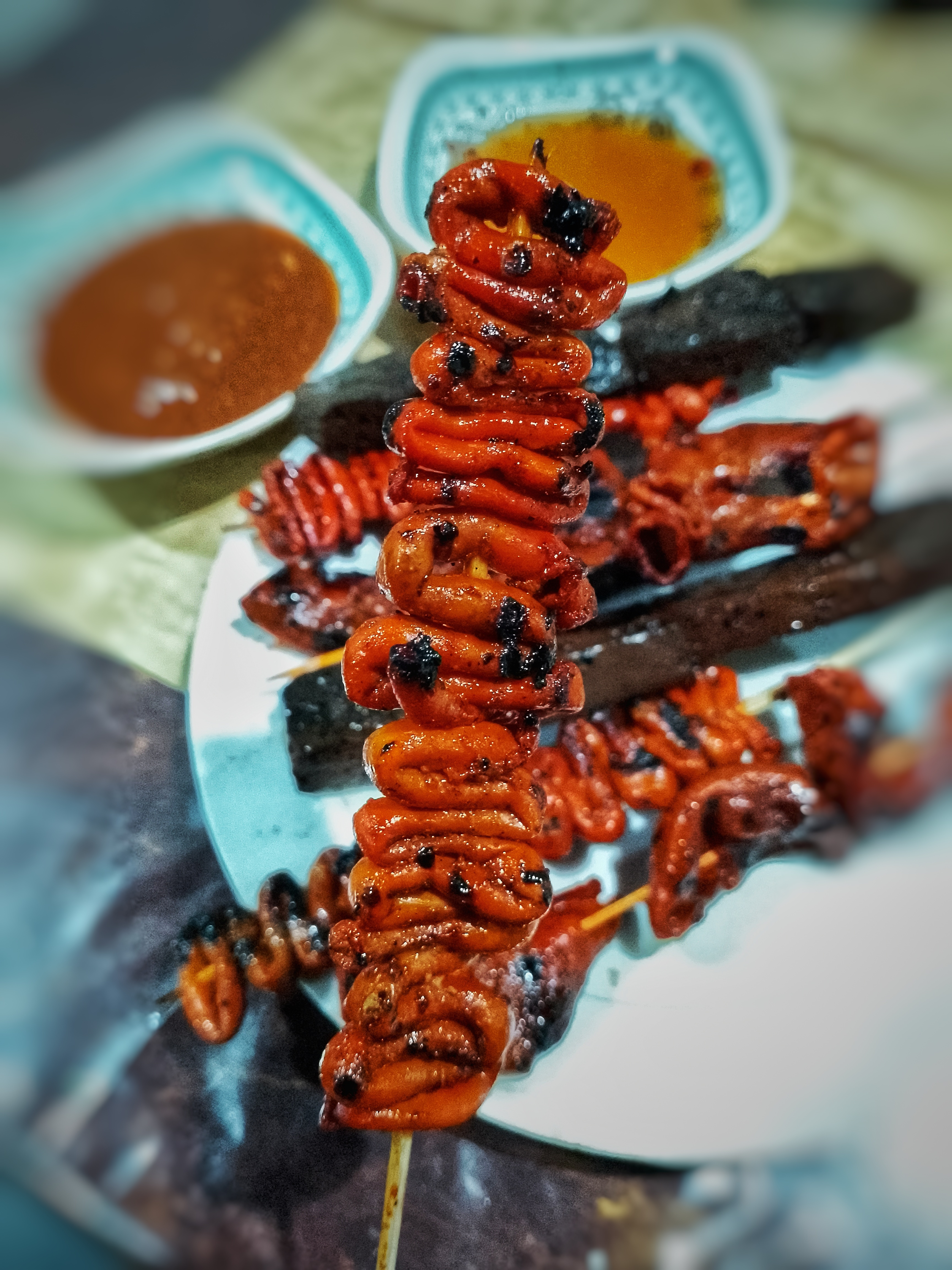
Isaw ng manok (chicken intestines)

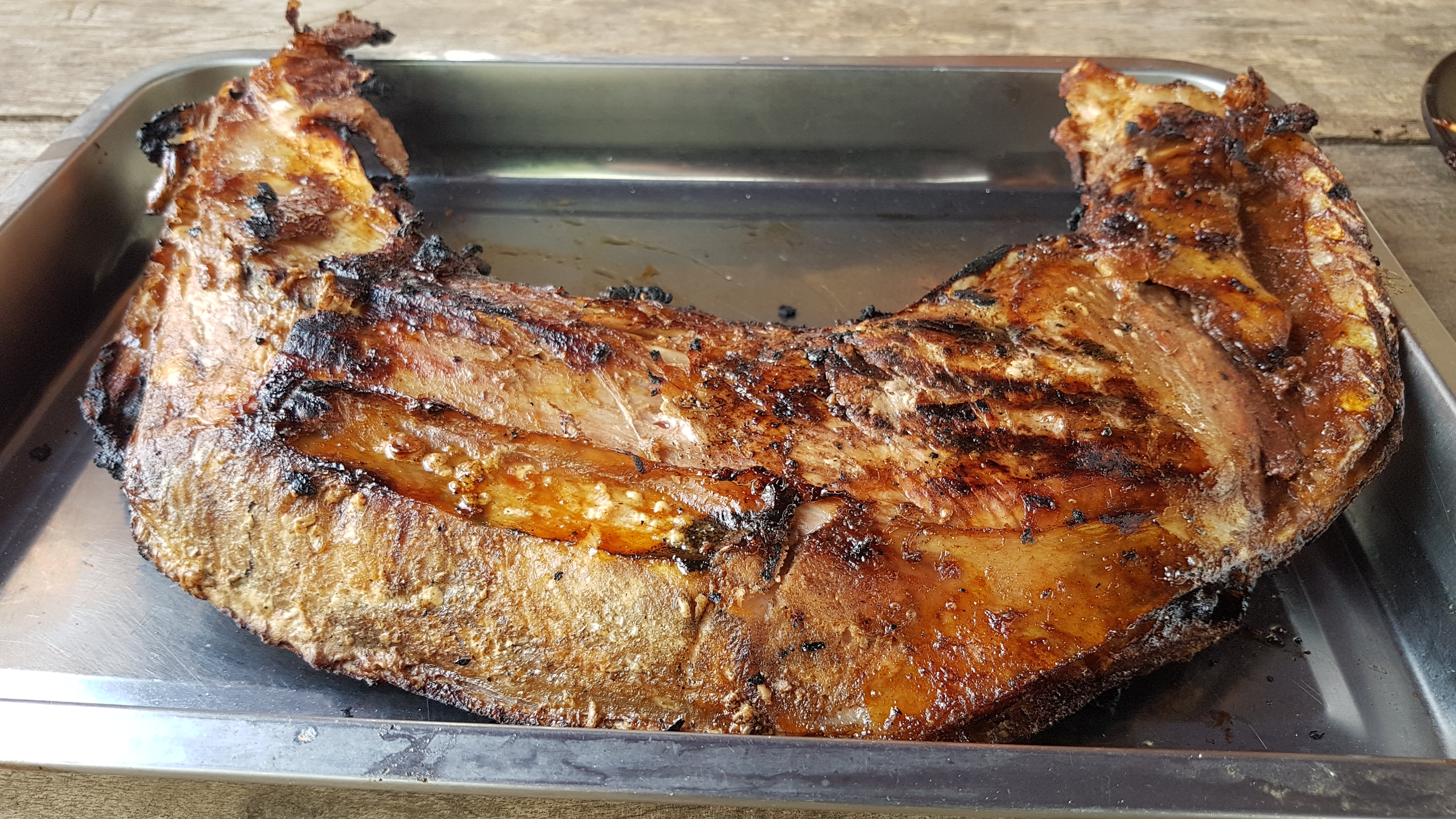
Inihaw na panga (tuna jaw)

== See also ==
- Dak-kkochi
- Kinilaw
- Philippine adobo
- Regional variations of barbecue
- List of barbecue dishes
