= Photography in the Philippines =

The pioneers of photography in the Philippines were Western photographers, mostly from Europe. The practice of taking photographs and the opening of the first photo studios in Spanish Philippines, from the 1840s to the 1890s, were driven by the following reasons: photographs were used as a medium of news and information about the colony, as a tool for tourism, as a fork anthropology, as a means for asserting social status, as an implement for historical documentation, as a team for communication, as materials for propaganda, and as a source of ideas for illustrations and engravings. The practice of photography in the Philippines was not without the influence and influx of Western-art concepts into the colonized archipelago.

== Spanish era ==
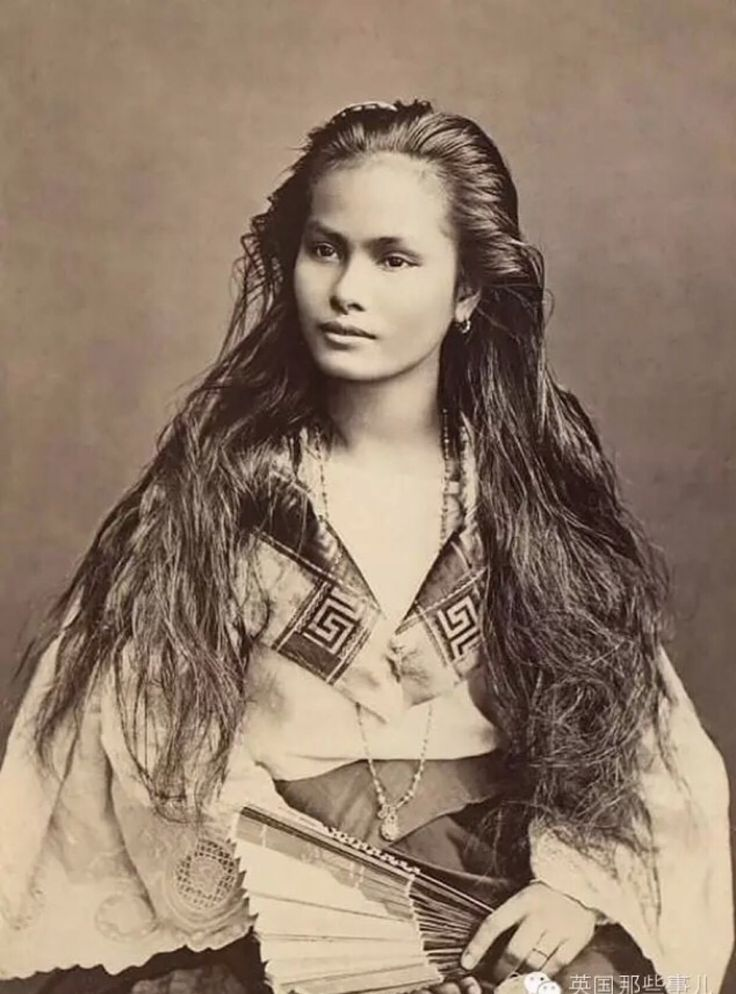
Indígena de clase rica (Mestiza Sangley-Filipina, 18 x 24 cm), an 1875 photograph taken by the Dutch photographer, Francisco van Camp.

=== Commercial photography ===
The beginnings of photography in the Philippines date back to the 1840s with two preserved daguerreotypes, one of Intramuros, Manila showing a flag and a portrait of the photographer himself named W. W. Wood. Although known as the oldest preserved photographs of the Philippines, their exact date remains unclear. The first written record of the employ of photography in the Philippines, however, was mentioned in an 1843 book written by a Spaniard traveler, diplomat and poet, Sinibaldo de Mas. It is believed that de Mas used a daguerreotype camera in 1841. The use of photography became more common in Manila and the rest of the Philippines from the year 1860 onwards. Although it is believed that the first photography studios were opened in the Philippines in the 1850s, the first known actively operational photo studio was that of the British photographer Albert Honnis. Recognized as a resident photographer in the Philippines since 1865 through the 1870s, Honnis was a popular producer of commercial “visiting cards” and “aesthetic” picture portraits. Honnis’ assignment as a commissioned photographer of the Russell & Sturgis Company, a prominent sugar-cane corporation of the time, enabled him to compile panoramic photographs of Spanish Manila and the Pasig River (Vistas de Manila, or Views of Manila). Other pioneers of the photography business in the Philippines – apart from Sinibaldo de Mas and W. W. Wood – were a Dutch photographer named Francisco van Kamp, Manuel Maidin, Pedro Picón, a German photographer named Enrique Schüren, C. Bonifás, E. M. Barretto, Francisco Pertierra, Manuel Arias Rodriquez, L. González, and an American photographer named Dean Conant Worcester.

=== Landscape photography ===
The first evidence of the use of photography in the Philippine panorama as the basis for illustrations in printed publications, such as magazines and travel guides, was in the 1875 book by Fedor Jagor. Translated into Spanish, Jagor's Reisen in den Philippinen, it was considered as one of the best travel books. It recounted his travels to the Philippines in 1859 and in 1860.

=== News, history and nature through cameras ===
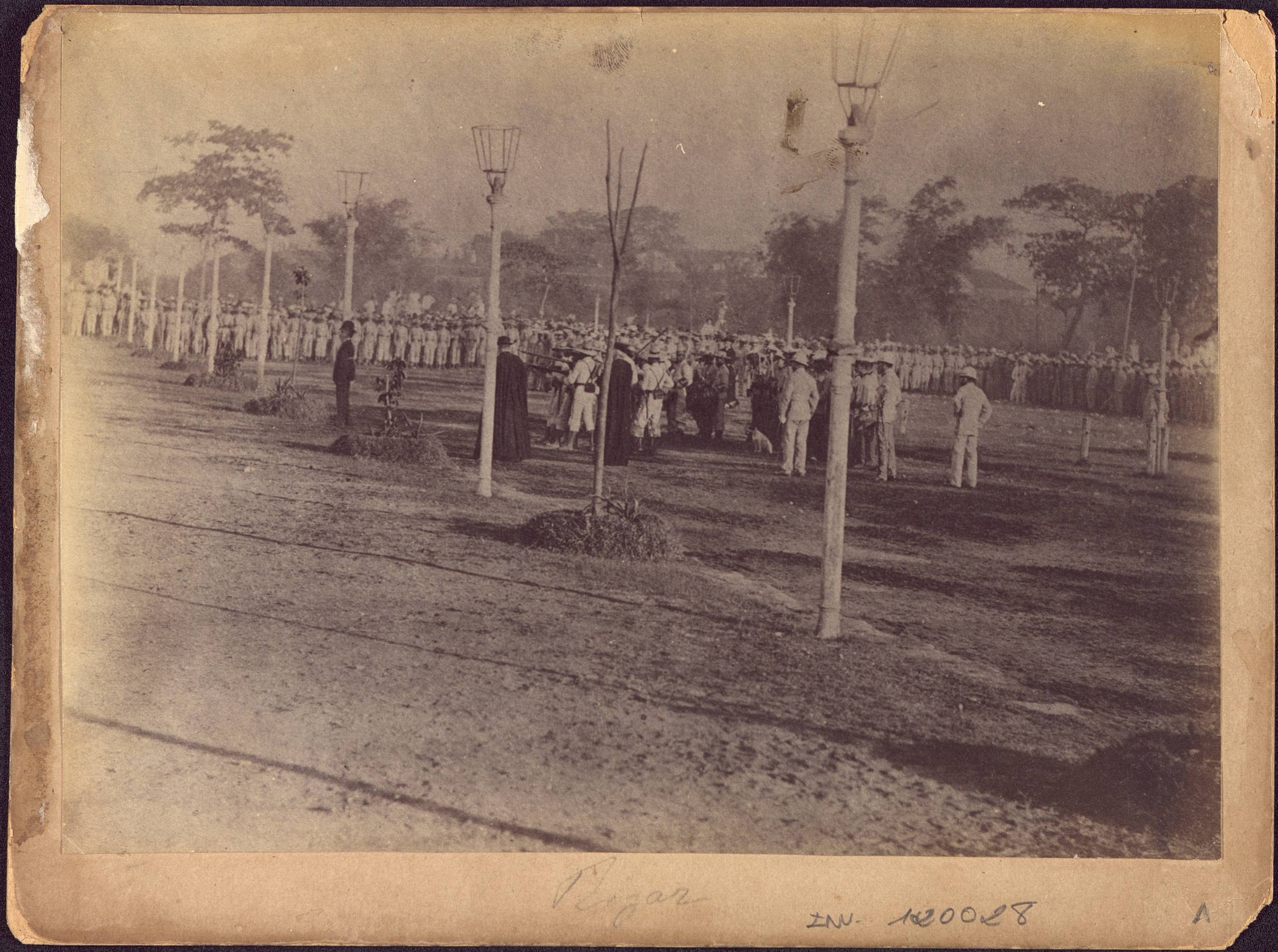
The execution by firing squad of José Rizal, December 30, 1896. This photograph (Fusilamiento de José Rizal) was taken by Manuel Arias Rodriguez, a Spanish creole.

==== Provincial and missionary life ====
Everyday life of early Filipinos and foreign missionaries were epitomized in the Provincia de Cagayan (Cagayan Province), an album lodged at Madrid's Museo Nacional de Antropología (National Museum of Anthropology). The album, believed to have been published between 1874 and 1880, documented 19th century tobacco farming methods in Luzon. There were also photographs depicting local customs, pastimes and traditions.

Despite the difficulty in imposing Spanish dominion over Islamic Mindanao, Spaniards were able to produce the albums Recuerdos de Mindanao (Memories of Mindanao) and the 1892 Vistas de las poblaciones de Cottabato, Rio Grande de Mindanao, Joló, Liangan, Monungam,… y de tipos indigenas, asi como de tropas españolas en Filipinas (Views of the towns of Cotabato, River Grande in Mindanao, Jolo, Liangan, Monungam, and of indigenous types, as well as of Spanish troops in the Philippines). These pictures were able to illustrate Mindanao landscapes, sultanate settlements, and the living situations of Filipino Muslims and Spanish soldiers and missionaries.

==== Natural disasters ====
Photography in 19th century Philippines also preserved visual records of the callous living conditions in the tropics. The existence of cameras and photographers, both professionals and amateurs, confirmed the reality of natural disasters such as volcanic eruptions, earthquakes, landslides, forest fires, floods, typhoons and tornadoes in the Philippines. The aftermath of an 1863 earthquake was witnessed and recorded by Martinez Hébert, a photographer of the Spanish Royal Household, while the devastation caused by the seismic activities that occurred on July 14, 18, 20 and 22, 1880 were captured by the lenses of the Dutch photographer Francisco Van Camp.

==== Industrialization ====
Status of public works in the Philippines were catalogued in the 1887 album, Obras del Puerto de Manila (Works of Manila Harbor) and in an 1896 book published by the Board of Manila Harbor. Operational and under-construction lighthouses spanning the years 1889–1893 in the Philippines were also catalogued in the Obras públicas: Faros (Public Works: Lighthouses) by Madrid's Archive of the Royal Palace.

==== Relationship to anthropology ====
The invention of photographs lessened the need for anthropologists to travel to places such as the Philippines for the sake of their work. Photographs became one of the important secondary sources of anthropologists for their case studies. However, despite the advantages, this photography business also created the tendency of photographers and the anthropologist themselves to manipulate their pictures and subjects such as employing staged scenes for scientific ends. Another accompanying problem of this “manipulation” would be the installation of stereotype human beings into the psyche of Western scientific groups. And also the tendency to produce “voyeuristic” specimens as evidenced by the great number of native women with exposed upper bodies.

== First Filipino photographer ==
One of the first photographers of Filipino nationality was Félix Laureano. His pictorial compositions, such as En el baño (In the Bathroom) and Cuadrilleros (Laborers), focused on human forms, cockfights and bullfights in the Philippines. He also became the first photographer to publish a book of photographs about the Philippines (Recuerdos de Filipinas, or Memories of the Philippines) in Barcelona in 1895. Laureano was also regarded as “the first Filipino artist to consciously use photography as a medium for art”.

== American era ==
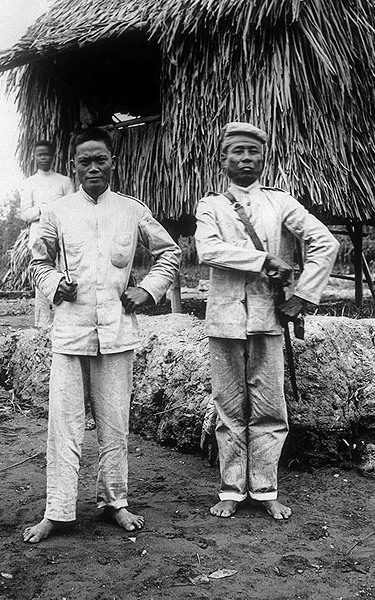
An 1899 photograph of Filipino military officers.

=== The Thomasites ===
After the Spanish–American War, the Philippines was ceded to the United States. Photographing the Philippines was continued by Americans, such as soldiers and the Thomasites. One Thomasite who took pictures of early twentieth century Philippines was Philinda Rand. During her tenure as an English-language teacher in the Philippines, Rand took photographs that show many aspects of Filipino life in Silay and Lingayen where she resided. Her pictures included people, students, missionaries, buildings, animals, and sceneries from 1901 to 1907.

=== Categories ===
Photography in the Philippines during American colonialism in the country produced two categories of photographic genre: the colonial American-centered photography and Filipino-centered photography:

==== Colonial American-centered images ====
In this category, photographs taken by Americans of Filipinos portrayed Filipino men and women and sceneries or backgrounds as a part of scientific or anthropological study or as a stimulator of curiosity. From 1900 to 1914, the American expeditioners became fascinated with Filipino hill tribes known as the Igorots, a native group that composed an eight of the Filipino population at the time. The trend of photography in the Philippines during the American era was to present colonial or imperial superiority and to differentiate racial status, skin hue, body size, cultural context, dress codes and dressing habits compared to American ways and physical features. An example was the head hunting practice of the Igorots, a tribal practice engaged in by these tribes to settle social conflicts through individual revenge rather than mass warfare, which was sensationalized in American-produced images of skulls. In relation to the mode of dressing, American colonialists used the amount of garments worn by tribal Filipinos as an indicator of levels of Philippine social development to show skull shapes. The Filipino tribespeople were also presented as domestic servants and as human exhibits.

The 1900s also became the source of some of the first pornographic and erotic pictures of Filipino women, such as the nude photographs of Philippine tribal women produced by Dean Conant Worcester, an American photographer and former Secretary of the Interior of the colonial government of the United States.

==== Filipino-centered photography ====
Filipinos during the American era who were given the opportunity to “control their appearance” in front of cameras of formal picture-taking studios presented a “media persona” that was distinguishably different from what were presented in images taken by Americans who have scientific and anthropological aims. During these personal and formal photographic moments, Filipino women were able to demonstrate female “virtue and refinement” by being garbed in fashionable and “religious” garments of the time; while the Igorot people were given that chance to show off their status and prestige by standing straight, firm, and wearing their tribal coats and hand-held canes.

== Filipino life, culture, and identity through images ==
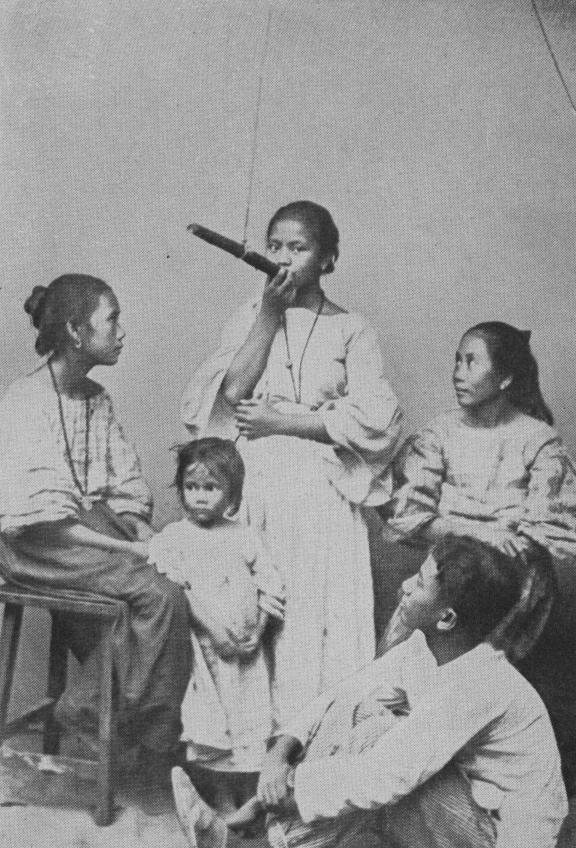
Smoking the Family Cigar, an early photograph of a Filipino family living in Northern Luzon. Photograph taken by James David Givens and published by Hicks-Judd Company in 1912. This picture could have been taken earlier than 1912.

As a tool for presenting Philippine culture and identity, photography revealed that Filipinos during the Spanish period and American colonialism had a distinct society of their own. During the late 1800s, both elite Spanish and Filipino members of Philippine society employed photographs as recorders of social lifestyle. Before American colonialism took hold of the Philippine Islands, an American photographer shot photos of the people and life in the City of Manila in 1886. Without the influence of American colonialistic attitude, the photographer was able to record the actual and uncontrolled street life of Filipino people living in the city, including cleanly dressed vendors with “religious necklaces” and a young Filipino lad collecting water from a public pump. The photographer's images presented Filipinos exuding natural grace and self-confidence in front of his camera, without any sign of being intimidated by the photograph taker's technological instrument.

In the 1930s, photography was incorporated it by Filipinos to become an “indigenized” part of Philippine culture and society. Examples of this cultural incorporation include photographing of weddings, wakes, portraits of Filipino beauty pageant queens, politicians, cult leaders, and popular Philippine sceneries and panorama. From 1935 to 1941 – the Philippine Commonwealth period – Filipino politicians utilized photography as a means for propaganda and election agenda. Later on, the boom in Philippine photography, resulted to photographic albums bound and collected by Filipino families that preserved recorded baptisms, school life, family reunions, social gatherings and outings, marriages, wedding anniversaries, wakes, and funerals. For them, photography has become a tool for preserving familial genealogy and societal history, recorded imageries that are handed down continuously from one generation to another.

The Filipinos developed their own unique character of posing in front of the camera. Because they are sensitive and self-conscious to how they should present and portray themselves through photographs, Filipino individuals or groups are not passive posers. Photographically, they are able to project a “certain style (…) or aspect” of themselves. In viewing images, Filipinos find “layers of meaning about the (…) character and persona” of the subject, or subjects, caught in the photograph.

== See also ==
- Philippine history
- PinoyCentric

Legal issues surrounding photography in the Philippines

- Photography and the law#Philippines
- Freedom of panorama in the Philippines
