= Chicken inasal =

Roasted chicken dish from the Philippines

Chicken Inasal
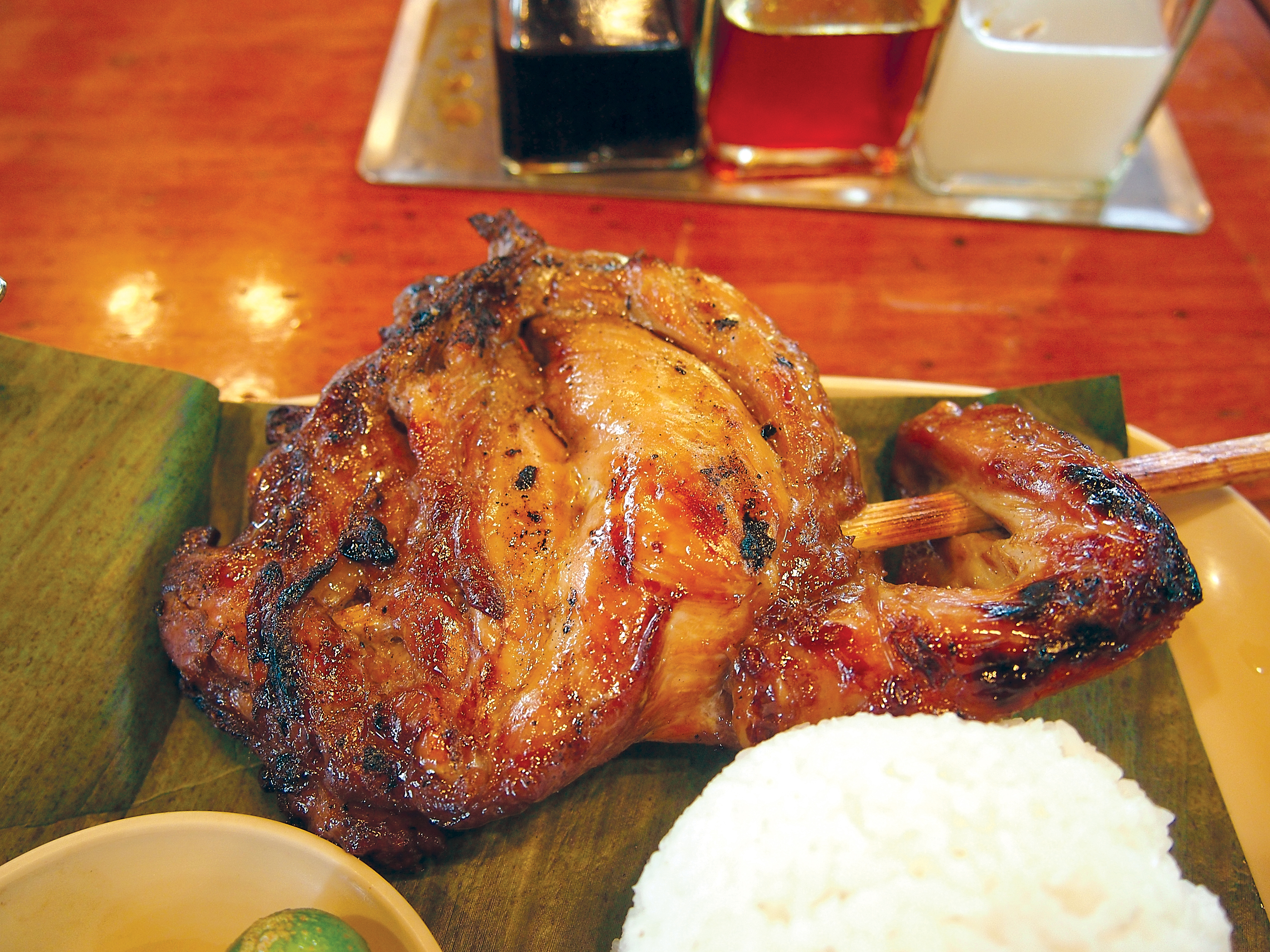
- Chicken inasal served in Mang Inasal
- Alternative names: Hiligaynon: Inasal nga manok
- Course: Main course
- Place of origin: Philippines
- Region or state: Western Visayas, Negros Island Region
- Serving temperature: Hot
- Main ingredients: Chicken, calamansi juice, black pepper, vinegar and annatto
- Similar dishes: Inihaw

Chicken inasal, commonly known simply as inasal, is a Visayan variant of the Filipino chicken dish lechon manok. It is made from chicken, typically served by the breast and wing (Pecho) or leg and/or thigh (Paa/Hita) parts, that is marinated in a mixture of calamansi, black pepper, coconut vinegar and annatto before being grilled over hot coals while basted with the marinade. It is served with rice, calamansi, soy sauce, chicken oil and vinegar (often sinamak vinegar, a palm vinegar infused with garlic, chili peppers and langkawas).

There are two popular versions of chicken inasal: the Bacolod and the Iloilo. The usual difference between them is that Bacolod's inasal has a slightly sour base flavor, while Iloilo's has a sweeter flavor.

== Origin ==
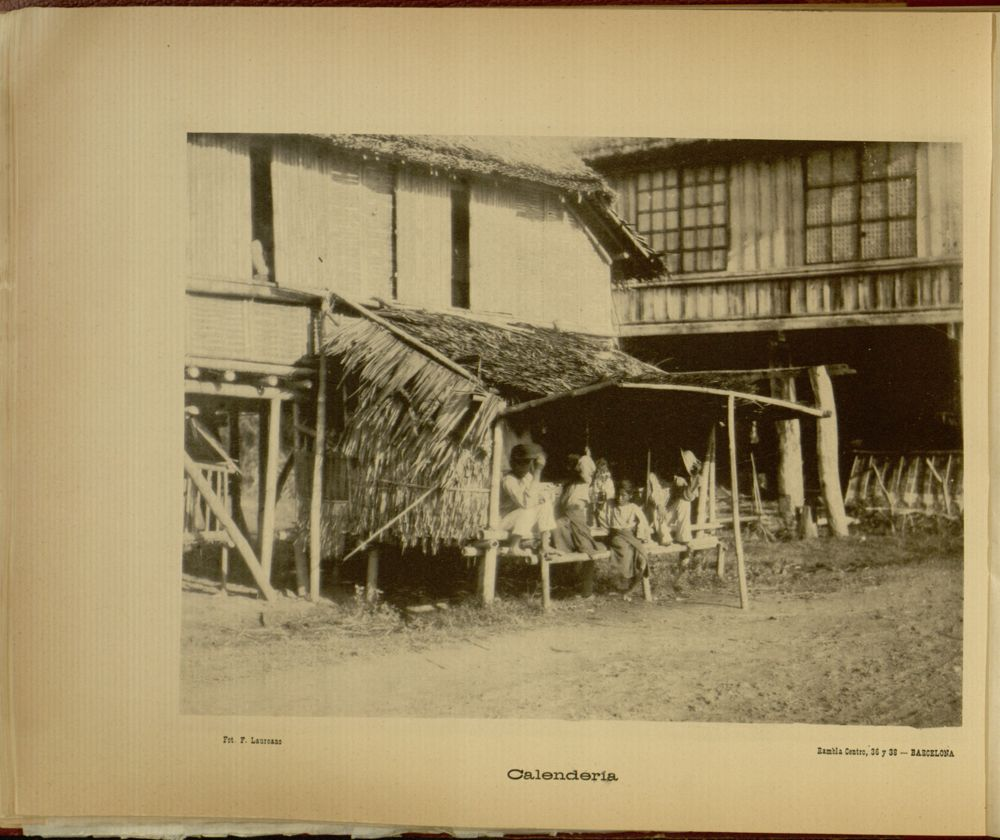
A Calenderia in Iloilo in the 1890s, selling chicken inasal

One of the earliest documentations of chicken inasal was by Felix Laureano in his photo book, Recuerdos de Filipinas, which describes the daily lives and culture of Iloilo and Panay. The book published in 1895 in Madrid, Spain, listed inihao nga manuc as one of the items sold in the photo of a Calenderia, a store that sells food. Inihao nga manuc (Inihaw nga manok) was described as pollo asado, Spanish for grilled or roasted chicken, which is now popularly known as chicken inasal.

Banoy Velez from Oton, Iloilo, who started Velez Inasal, claimed to have introduced chicken inasal in Bacolod in 1946. The chicken inasal became widely popular in the 1970s on Bacolod's Cuadra Street (Chicken Alley).

== Bacolod Chicken Inasal ==
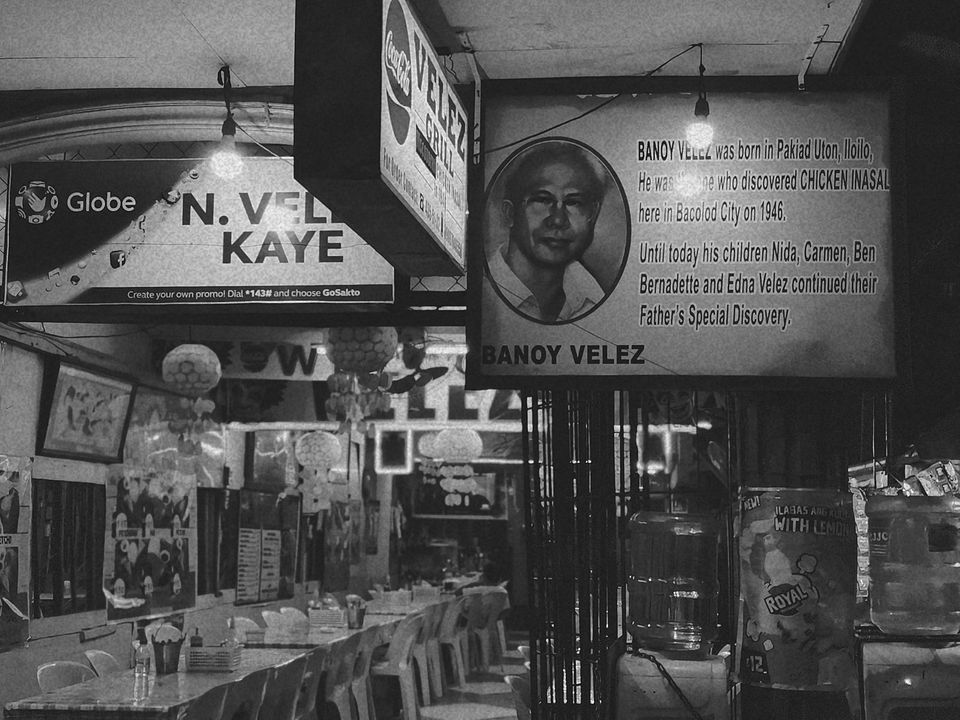
Banoy Velez started selling chicken inasal in Bacolod in 1946

Chicken inasal is a common dish in the Visayas, and is a popular specialty in the city of Bacolod, where an entire street market is dedicated to local dishes, particularly inasal. A sign in the heart of the market reads "Manokan Country" (literally "Chicken Country" in Hiligaynon).

== Declarations ==
Chicken inasal was declared a locally important cultural property of Bacolod on November 16, 2022. On October 31, 2023, Iloilo City was recognized as UNESCO’s Creative City of Gastronomy. Iloilo listed chicken inasal as one of its food offerings. In October 2024, TasteAtlas listed Bacolod chicken inasal as the best of 100 Filipino foods.

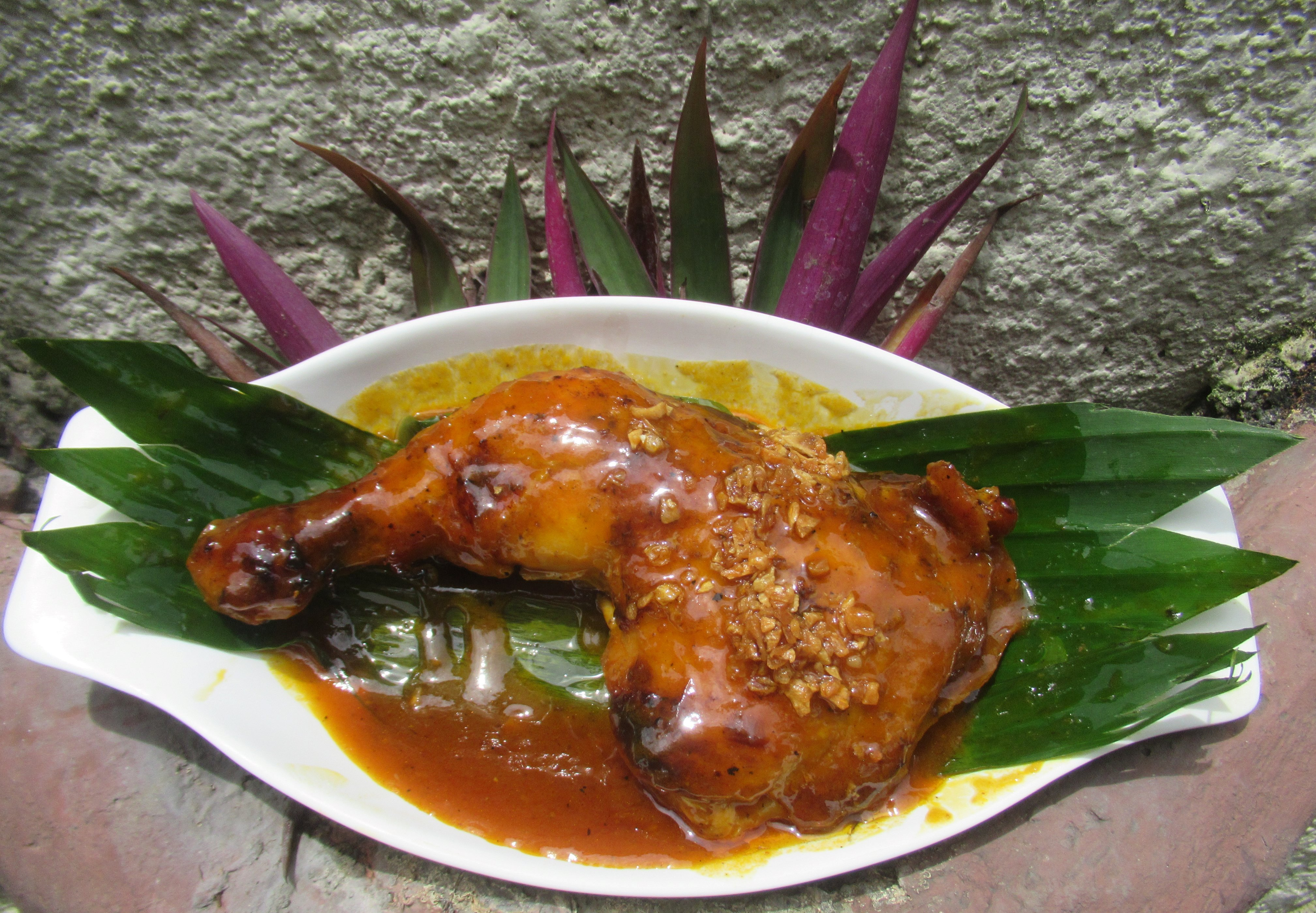
Inasal with barbecue sauce

== Popular restaurants ==
Among the popular restaurants serving chicken inasal are Bacolod Chicken Inasal, which was started by the Tanalgo sisters in Mandaluyong in 1993; JT's Manukan Grille, founded by actor Joel Torre in Quezon City in 2003; Mang Inasal, founded by Edgar Sia in Iloilo City in 2003; Aida's Manokan and Nena's Beth, both located at Manokan Country in Bacolod ; Island Chicken Inasal in Boracay; Balay Dako in Tagaytay; and Barrio Inasal in Iloilo City.

In 2025, the Makati branch of Aida's and Chef JP Anglo’s Sarsa, both serving the Bacolod variant of chicken inasal, were recognized and included in the Philippine inaugural edition of the Michelin Guide. In 2026 another Makati branch of a Bacolod based Inasal restaurant chain; Bacolod Chicken House express was added to the 2026 Michelin Guidein the Bib Gourmand category.

Mang Inasal is the largest restaurant chain serving chicken inasal, with over 600 stores in the Philippines.

== See also ==
- Inihaw
- Ayam bakar
- List of chicken dishes
- List of spit-roasted foods
