= Lechon manok =

Chicken dish in Filipino cuisine

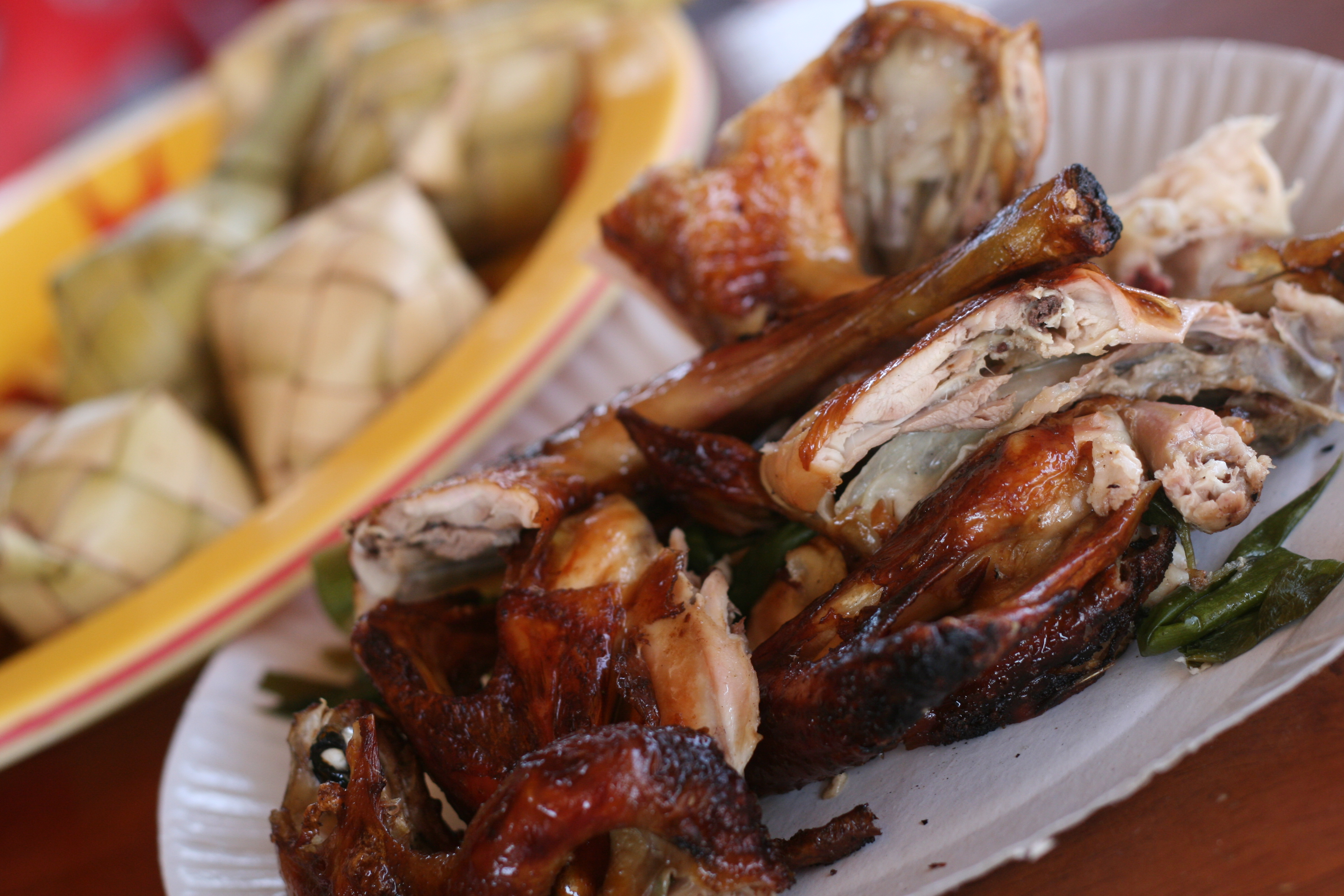
- Lechon manok served with puso rice
- Alternative names: Filipino roast chicken
- Course: Main course
- Place of origin: Philippines
- Region or state: Visayas
- Serving temperature: Hot
- Main ingredients: Chicken, lemongrass, garlic, bay leaf, onion, black pepper, muscovado, soy sauce, fish sauce
- Variations: Chicken inasal
- Similar dishes: Inihaw

Lechon manok is a Filipino spit-roasted chicken dish made with chicken marinated in a mixture of garlic, bay leaf, onion, black pepper, soy sauce, and patis (fish sauce). The marinade may also be sweetened with muscovado or brown sugar. It is distinctively stuffed with tanglad (lemongrass) and roasted over charcoal. It is typically eaten dipped in a toyomansi or silimansi mixture of soy sauce, calamansi, and labuyo chilis. It is paired with white rice or puso and commonly served with atchara pickles as a side dish.

It is a very popular dish in the Philippines and is readily available at roadside restaurants. Several restaurant chains specialize in lechon manok, such as Andok's, Baliwag Lechon Manok, Chooks-to-Go, and Ang Lechon Manok ni Sr. Pedro.

== See also ==
- Inihaw
- Asado
- Chicken inasal
- Lechon
- Lechon kawali
- List of spit-roasted foods
- Chicken
