= Roasting jack =

Device which rotates meat roasting on a spit

Illustration of a bottle jack from Mrs Beeton's Book of Household Management

A roasting jack is a machine which rotates meat roasting on a spit. It can also be called a spit jack, a spit engine or a turnspit, although this name can also refer to a human turning the spit, or a turnspit dog. Cooking meat on a spit dates back at least to the 1st century BC, but at first spits were turned by human power. In Britain, starting in the Tudor period, dog-powered turnspits were used; the dog ran in a treadmill linked to the spit by belts and pulleys. Other forms of roasting jacks included the steam jack, driven by steam, the smoke jack, driven by hot gas rising from the fire, and the bottle jack or clock jack, driven by weights or springs.

== Weight or clock jacks ==
A great majority of the jacks used prior to the 19th century were powered by a descending weight, often made of stone or iron, sometimes of lead. Although most commonly referred to as spit engines or jacks, these were also termed weight or clock jacks (clock jacks was the more common term in North America).

Earlier jacks of this type had a train of two arbors (spindles), later ones had a more efficient three arbor train. In the case of British examples, almost without exception, the governor or flywheel was set above the engine (as opposed to being located within the frame) and to one side; to the right for two train and to the left for three train engines.

European jacks are characterised by a flywheel set centrally and often within the frame; commonly the highest part of the frame has a bell-like arch that the shaft for the flywheel passes through.

== Steam jack ==
A steam-powered roasting jack was first described by the Ottoman polymath and engineer Taqi al-Din in his Al-Turuq al-samiyya fi al-alat al-ruhaniyya (The Sublime Methods of Spiritual Machines), in 1551. A steam-driven jack was patented by the American clockmaker John Bailey II in 1792, and steam jacks were later commercially available in the United States.

== Smoke jack ==
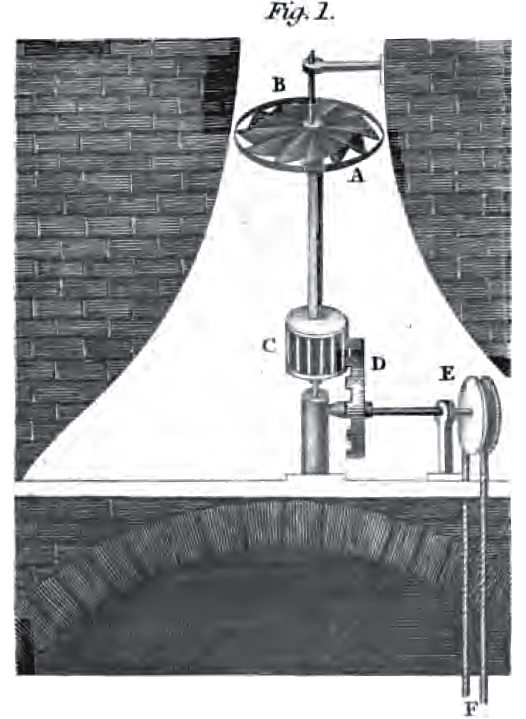
Smoke-jack from Mathematical and Philosophical Works of the Right Rev. John Wilkins (1802)

Leonardo da Vinci sketched a smoke-jack in the form of a turbine with four vanes. Smoke-jacks were also illustrated in Vittorio Zonca's book of machines (1607), and in John Wilkins's Mathematical Magick. The 1826 A Treatise of Mechanics describes a smoke-jack:

Smoke-jack is an engine used for the same purpose as the common jack; and is so called from its being moved by means of the smoke, or rarefied air, ascending the chimney, and striking against the sails of the horizontal wheel AB (plate XXI. fig 1.), which being inclined to the horizon, is moved about the axis of the wheel, together with the pinion C, which carries the wheels D and E; and E carries the chain F, which turns the spit. The wheel AB should be placed in the narrow part of the chimney, where the motion of the smoke is swiftest, and where also the greatest part of it must strike upon the sails.—The force of this machine depends on the draught of the chimney, and the strength of the fire.

Smoke-jacks are sometimes moved by means of spiral flyers coiling about a vertical axle; and at other times by a vertical wheel with sails like the float-boards of a mill: but the above is the more customary construction.

== Bottle-jack ==
A bottle-jack was a clockwork motor in a brass shell, shaped like a bottle; it was introduced in the late 18th Century and in many cases replaced the earlier and much more simple dangle spit.

== See also ==
- Rotisserie (modern style)
- List of cooking appliances
- History of steam engine
