= Sinibaldo de Mas =

Spanish diplomat (1809–1868)

Sinibaldo de Mas y Sanz
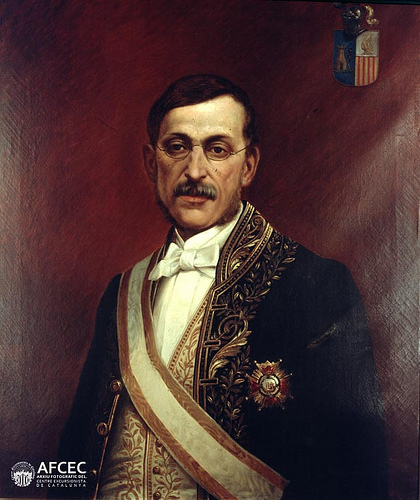
- Born: 1809; Barcelona, Spain
- Died: 1868 (aged 58–59); Madrid, Spain
- Occupations: Diplomat, ambassador, photographer, poet, traveler

Sinibaldo de Mas i Sans (1809, Barcelona – 1868, Madrid) was a Spanish diplomat to Asia during the 19th century. An adventurer and a poet, he introduced photography in the Philippines in 1841. He was also a Spanish ambassador to Macau. He supported Iberian federalism.

== In the Philippines ==
De Mas left Spain in 1834. During his two-and-a-half-year stay in the Philippines, de Mas made a living by taking photographs because of limited financial support from the Spanish government. It was believed that de Mas obtained his daguerreotype camera either in Spain or from Bengal, India in 1839. He wrote the Informe sobre el estado de las Filipinas en 1842 (A Report on the Status of the Philippines in 1842).
