= Rotisserie =

Style of roasting

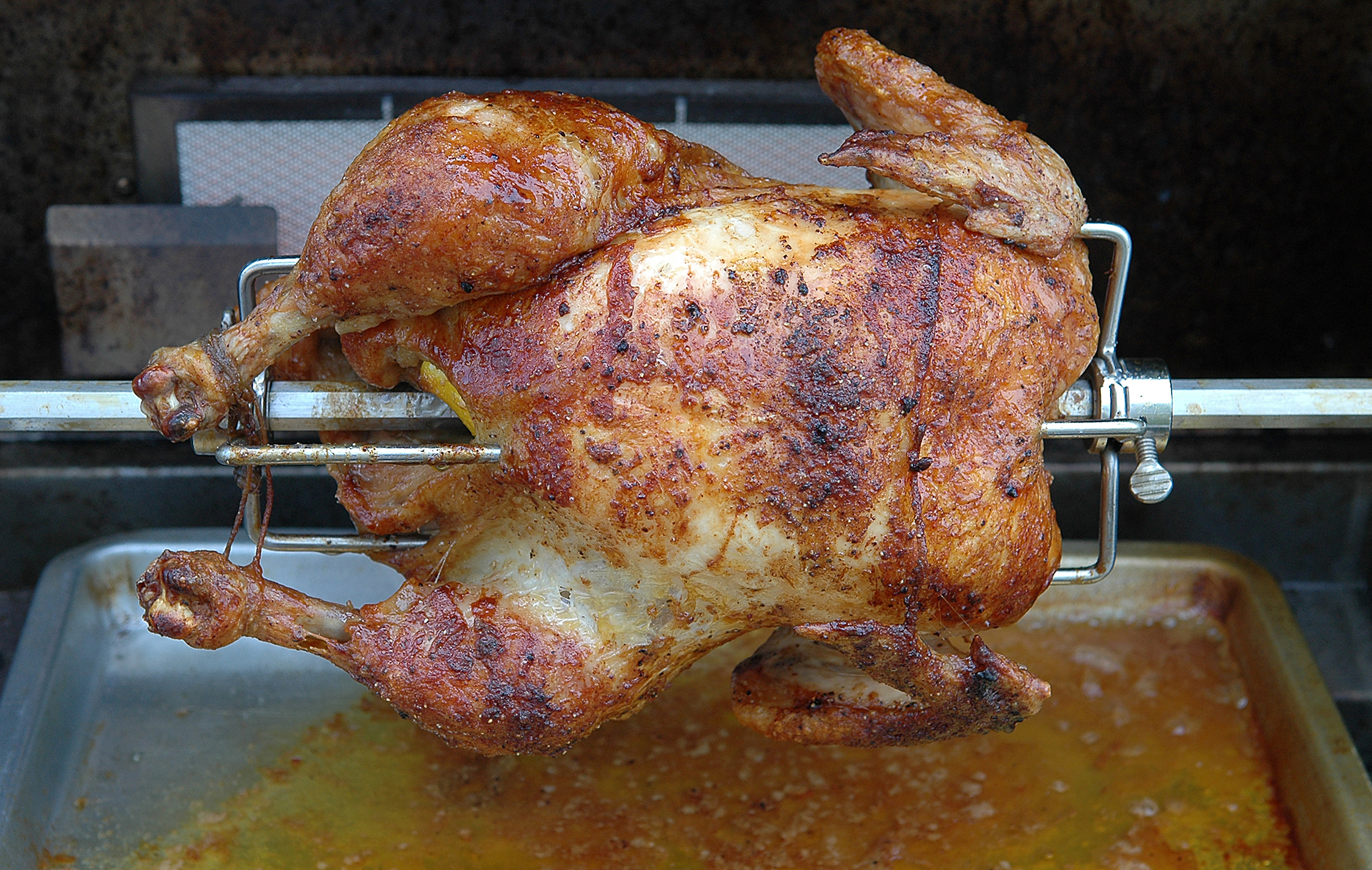
Rotisserie chicken cooking on a horizontal rotisserie

Rotisserie, also known as spit-roasting, is a style of roasting where meat is skewered on a spit – a long, solid rod used to hold food while it is being cooked over a fire in a fireplace or over a campfire, or roasted in an oven. This method is generally used for cooking large joints of meat or entire animals, such as pigs, chickens and turkeys. The rotation cooks the meat evenly in its own juices and allows easy access for continuous basting.

== History ==
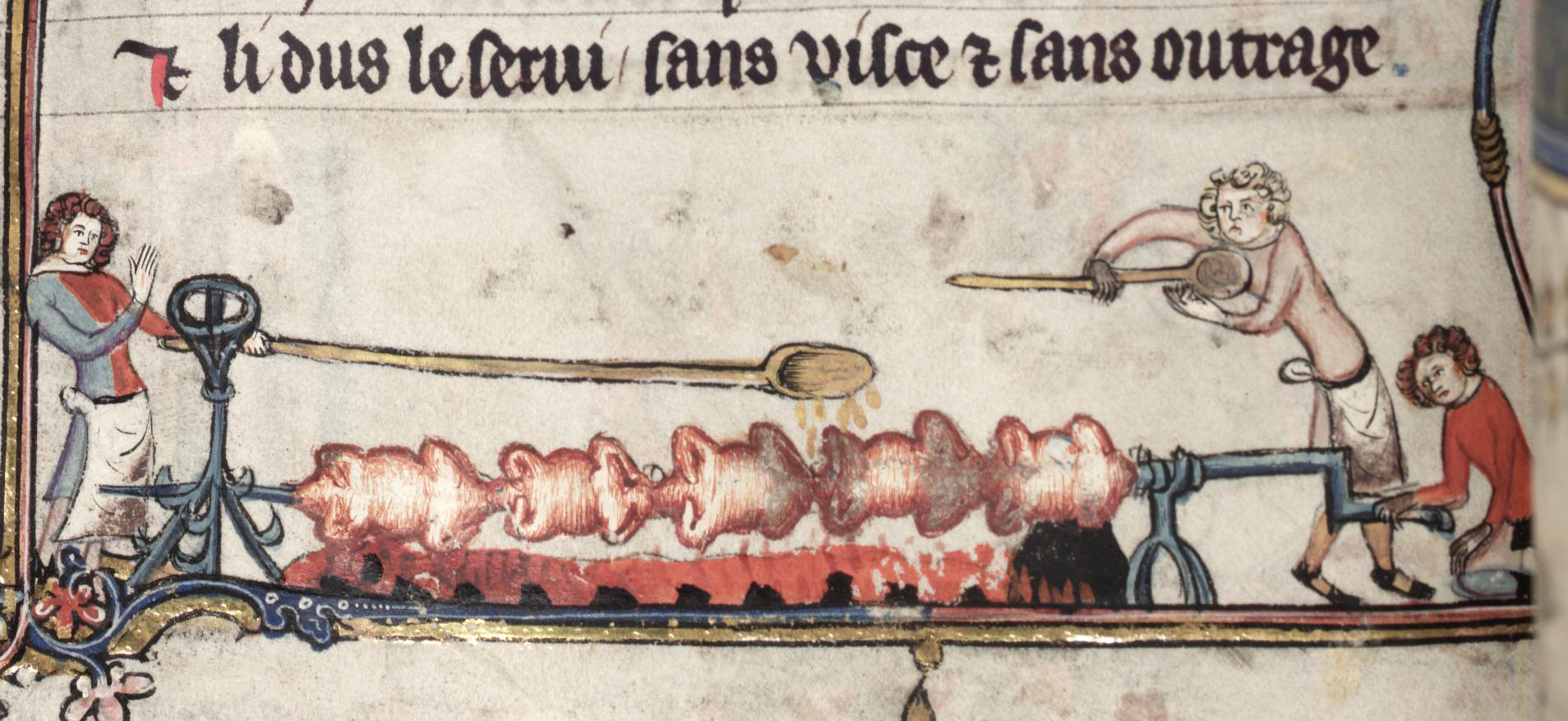
Spitted fowl are rotated by a hand crank and basted with a long-handled spoon in this illustration from the Romance of Alexander, Bruges, 1338–1344 (Bodleian Library).

In medieval cuisine and early modern kitchens, the spit was the preferred way of cooking meat in a large household. A servant, preferably a boy, sat near the spit turning the metal rod slowly and cooking the food; he was known as the "spit boy" or "spit jack". Mechanical turnspits ("roasting jacks") were later invented, first powered by dogs on treadmills, and then by steam power and mechanical clockwork mechanisms. The spit could also be powered by a turbine mounted in the chimney with a worm transmission for torque and speed conversion. Spits are now usually driven by electric motors.

Rotisserie can also refer to a mechanical device used for rotisserie cooking, or to a restaurant specializing in spit-roasted meat. The word comes from French where it first appeared in Paris shops around 1450. Additionally, in restaurants employing the Escoffierian brigade de cuisine, the rotisseur is the chef responsible for all spit-roasted, oven roasted, grilled and in some cases fried foods.

== Horizontal rotisserie ==
This style mounts the spit horizontally. They are often used to cook whole chickens or roasts of various meats including beef and pork. The design may include a single spit mounted over an open broiler or grill, a single spit mounted within an otherwise-conventional oven, or many spits mounted within a large industrial oven. The latter are commonly used to mass-produce roasted meats for sale to consumers.

In this style of rotisserie, balance is important. If the object to be cooked is far out of balance, it will impose a heavy load on the drive mechanism or cause the mechanism to fail to turn. Loose chicken legs or wings can also cause the mechanism to jam. For these two reasons, some skewering skill is required. High-end consumer ovens commonly come with a rotisserie (or allow the installation of a rotisserie as an option). In these cases, the motor drive mechanism is usually concealed within the oven. The rotisserie is used by removing the normal cooking racks; a special carrier may be needed to provide one or both bearing points for the spit.

The speed of rotation can vary, depending on the type of food being cooked and proximity to the heat source. Large animals, such as whole pigs, are often cooked at speeds ranging from 3 rpm to 1 rpm. Ron Popeil, inventor of the Ronco "Showtime" rotisserie oven, claimed that 6 rpm is an ideal speed for cooking a variety of foods.

Generally speaking, when a whole animal is being spit roasted, it is best rotated faster in the early part of the roasting, to help interior temperature rise without burning the exterior. Once the exterior has started to crust, then the rate of rotation is adjusted down to minimize dripping. This allows juices and drippings to stay on, thus maximizing flavor. The latter is particularly important if using a horizontal spit and coals or an open fire, in which case the drippings cannot be salvaged for basting. For a horizontal spit, it is also preferable to keep the roast further away from the heat source in the beginning, which minimizes infrared heating while preserving air convection heating. Later on, the roast is brought closer, thus combining intense convection and radiation heating.

Supermarkets commonly mass-produce rotisserie chickens using a horizontal rotisserie that has metal bars to hold the chicken in place through the weakest part of the breast (also which hardly affects the meat itself from the impaling, but still holds the chicken firmly in place) and the densest part of the chicken (located just below the drumstick of the chicken).

== Vertical rotisserie ==
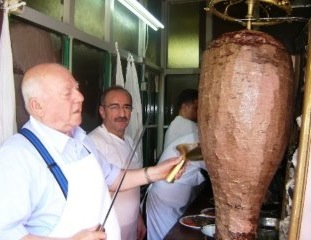
A vertical rotisserie cooking Döner kebab

Another style of rotisserie is the vertical rotisserie in which the heat is applied directly from the side or, less commonly, convected up from below. In this style of rotisserie, balance of the load is less important than with a horizontal rotisserie; this feature is useful, as the meat is typically shaved off a bit at a time.

The vertical roasting became popular in Istanbul in the 19th century, possibly as a space saving measure, but also allowed the meat to "self-baste", as the fat flows downwards.

Some dishes that are commonly cooked on a vertical rotisserie include:

- Döner kebab from Turkey
- Gyros, from Greece
- Shawarma, from the Middle East and the Arab World
- Taco al pastor, from Mexico

== See also ==
- Asado
- Barbecue
- Inihaw
- Lechon
- Lechon manok
- List of spit-roasted foods
- Pig roast
- Satay
- Skewer
