= Baliwag Lechon Manok =

Philippine restaurant chain

- Logo
- Type: Private
- Industry: Restaurants
- Genre: Filipino cuisine
- Founded: 1985; 41 years ago
- Founders: Dwight Salcedo; Dolores Salcedo
- Headquarters: Quezon City, Philippines
- Number of locations: 500+ (2025)
- Area served: Philippines
- Key people: Sarabeth Salcedo Soriano (Vice-president of operations)
- Products: Lechon manok Liempo
- Website: www.baliwaglechonmanok.com

Baliwag Lechon Manok (also known as Baliwag Lechon Manok at Liempo) is a Filipino restaurant chain that specializes in roasted chicken and pork. The company was established in 1985 and has over 500 outlets across the Philippines.

== History ==
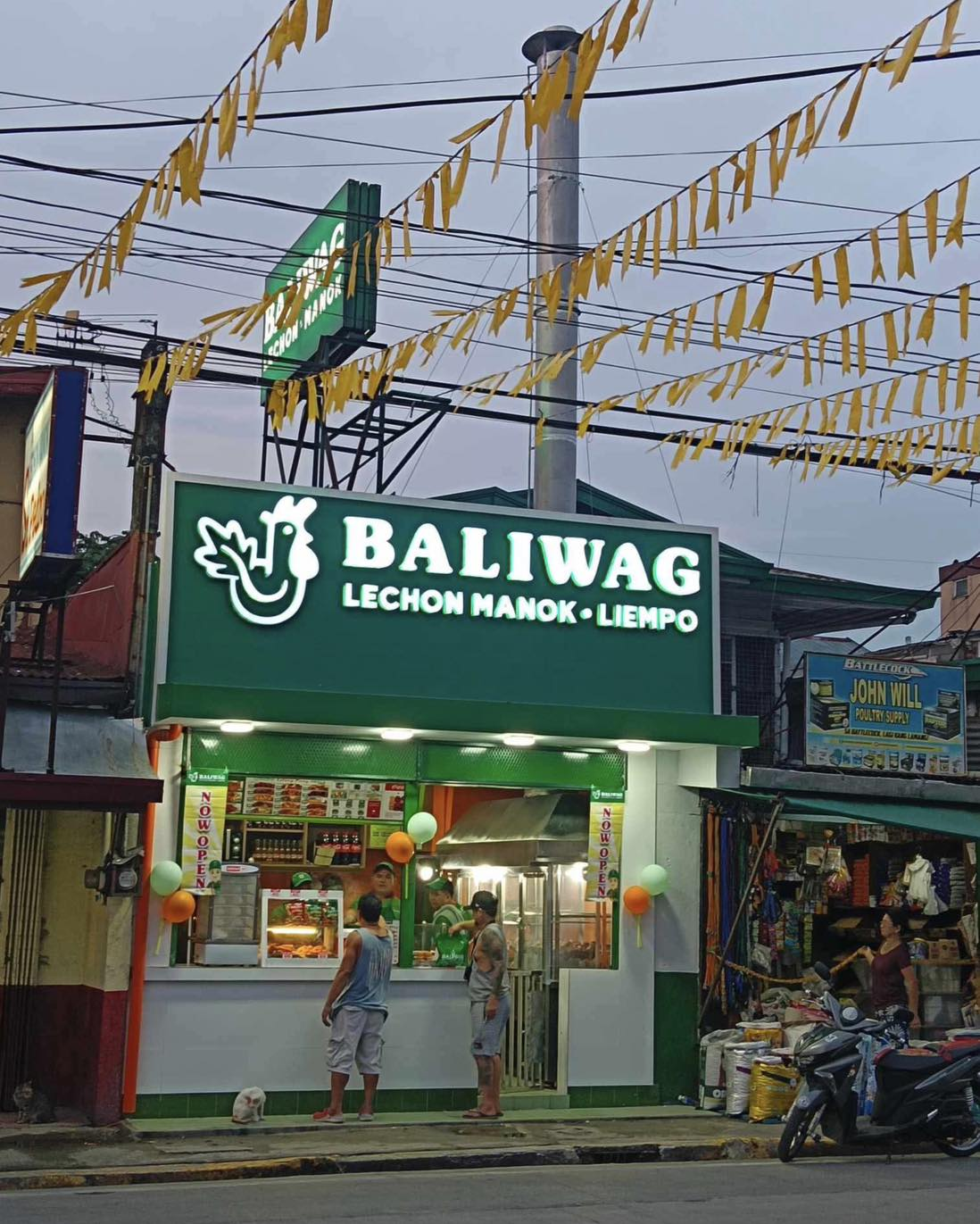
A Baliwag Lechon Manok storefront in Bacoor, Cavite Philippines.

Dwight and Dolores Salcedo founded the company in 1985. Before opening the restaurant, the couple owned a video rental shop called "Sarah Betamax" in Project 8, Quezon City, whose name is a portmanteau of their daughter Sarabeth and Betamax. They noticed that roasted chicken was becoming popular in their neighborhood. The couple used the empty space in front of their video shop to open a food stall. They started the business with a capital of ₱10,000. Half of this money came from a loan from their parents.

The name "Baliwag" honors the hometown of Dolores Salcedo, which is Baliwag, Bulacan. The founders used the letter "W" in the name instead of "U" (Baliuag) to make the brand name look different. The video rental business eventually closed, and the couple focused only on the food business.

The business grew from street kiosks into shopping mall food courts and restaurants. By 2021, the chain had more than 400 kiosks and 40 food court branches. Later, the founders' daughter, Sarabeth Salcedo Soriano, became the Vice President for Operations.

In September 2022, the company received criticism regarding a job advertisement. A job post for a "grill man" stated that applicants must not have tattoos. Social media users called the rule discriminatory. The company issued an apology for the mistake and stated that they do not discriminate against people with tattoos.

== Products ==
The main products are Filipino-style rotisserie chicken and pork belly. The founders developed the marinade recipe using herbs and spices. The food is sold with a liver sauce and atchara (pickled papaya).

Street kiosks usually cook the meat using charcoal. Branches inside malls use electric machines because of smoke regulations. The company says these machines try to copy the taste of charcoal cooking.

During the COVID-19 pandemic, the company began selling frozen food packs. These packs included ready-to-heat dishes like sisig, binagoongan, beef steak, kare-kare, beef caldereta, dinuguan, embutido and laing. The chain also sells fried pork items like bagnet and chicharon.
