= Francisco Pertierra =

Spanish photographer

Francisco Pertierra was a Spanish photographer of the 19th century who established in the Philippines. He became one of the first professional photographers of that country.

== Biography ==
Francisco Pertierra started at photography in Madrid, where he was scholar of Pedro Martínez de Hebert. He got a studio at 1864, on 13 Barcelona Street. Few years later, he was moved to Salamanca, where he opened a studio, despite that success was out of time and with undesirable conditions. However, he was the first photographer with a studio in that Castilian city, initially in the core of the Plaza Mayor. Later, he would compete with the French photographer Jean Poujade. Finally, different troubles caused him to transfer his studio to José Oliván and left the city. In 1885, Pertierra arrives to Manila (Philippines), where he established a new studio at 2nd Carriedo Street.

== Work ==
Furthermore, than working at the studio, Pertierra started to making publications of Madrid and he began to introduce at cinema, on he was one of the pioneer of the 7th art on Philippines.

== Expositions ==
- 2006. Filipiniana, an opened looking to the past & present of the Philippines, by the first time in Spain. Conde Duque Palace

== Books (selection) ==
His workings can see on a lot of books & articles about Philippines:

- The colonial imaginary – Photography on Philippines during Spanish period (1860-98), from Juan Guardiola.
