= Turnspit dog =

Dog type

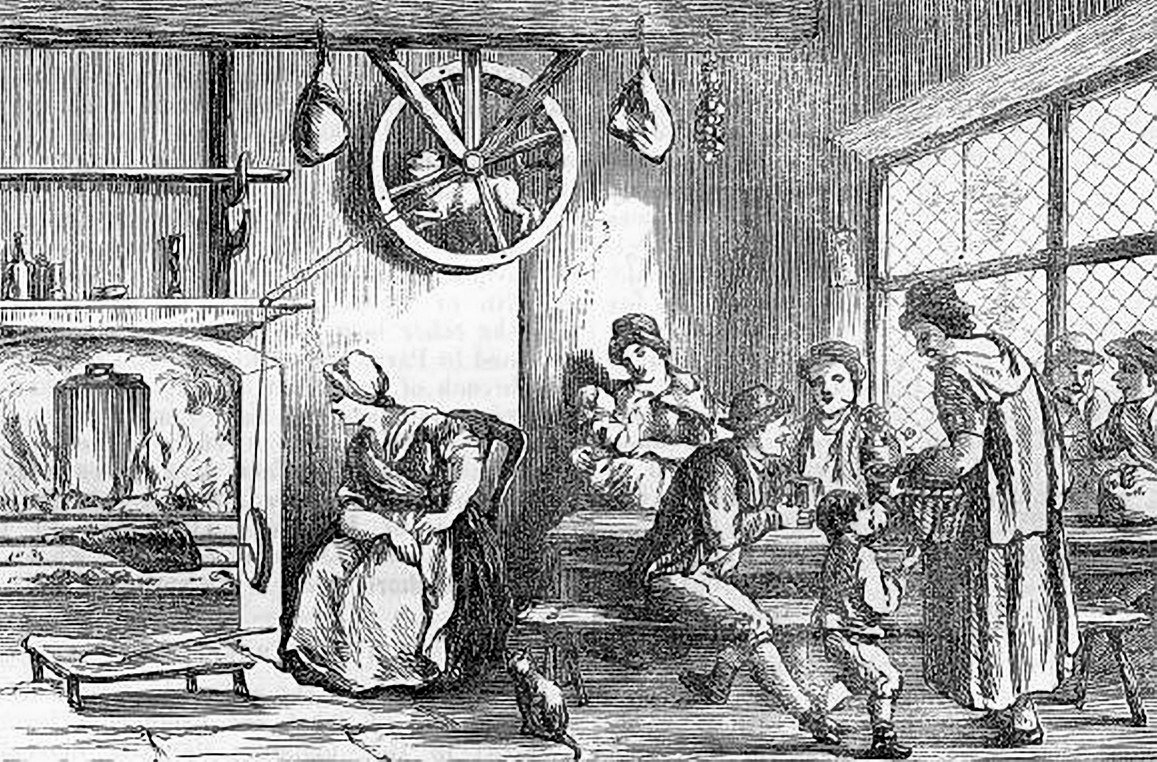
- A dog at work inside a wheel near the ceiling; from Remarks on a Tour to North and South Wales (1800)
- Origin: United Kingdom
- Breed status: Extinct

The turnspit dog was a short-legged, long-bodied dog bred to run on a wheel, called a turnspit or dog wheel, to turn meat as it cooked. It is mentioned in Of English Dogs in 1576 under the name "Turnespete". William Bingley's Memoirs of British Quadrupeds (1809) also talks of a dog employed to help chefs and cooks. It was also known as the Kitchen Dog, the Cooking Dog, or the Wheeling Dog. In Linnaeus's 18th-century classification of dogs it is listed as Canis vertigus (also used as Latin name for the Dachshund). The breed was lost, since it was considered to be such a lowly and common dog that no record was effectively kept of it. Some sources consider the turnspit dog a kind of Glen of Imaal Terrier, while others make it a relative of the Welsh Corgi.

With advancements in kitchen technology, the need for turnspit dogs declined. Over time, they were no longer bred for their specific function, and their numbers dwindled, eventually leading to their extinction.

A preserved example of a turnspit dog is displayed at Abergavenny Museum in Abergavenny, Wales.

== Work ==
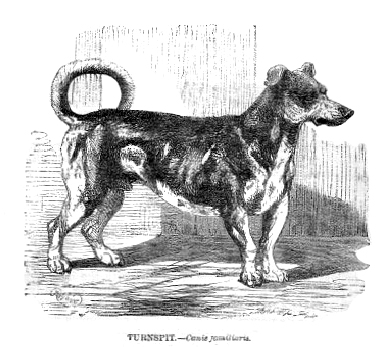
Illustration from The Illustrated Natural History (Mammalia), published in 1853, showing the conformation of a turnspit dog.

The turnspit dog was bred to run on a wheel in order to turn meat so it would cook evenly. Due to the strenuous nature of the work, a pair of dogs would often be worked in shifts. According to John George Wood in The Illustrated Natural History (Mammalia) (1853):

Just as the invention of the spinning jenny abolished the use of distaff and wheel, which were formerly the occupants of every well-ordained English cottage, so the invention of automaton roasting-jacks has destroyed the occupation of the Turnspit Dog, and by degrees has almost annihilated its very existence. Here and there a solitary Turnspit may be seen, just as a spinning-wheel or a distaff may be seen in a few isolated cottages; but both the Dog and the implement are exceptions to the general rule, and are only worthy of notice as being curious relics of a bygone time.

In former days, and even within the remembrance of the present generation, the task of roasting a joint of meat or a fowl was a comparatively serious one, and required the constant attendance of the cook, in order to prevent the meat from being spoiled by the unequal action of the fire. The smoke-jack, as it was rather improperly termed—inasmuch as it was turned, not by the smoke, but by the heated air that rushed up the chimney—was a great improvement, because the spit revolved at a rate that corresponded with the heat of the fire.

So complicated an apparatus, however, could not be applied to all chimneys, or in all localities, and therefore the services of the Turnspit Dog were brought into requisition. At one extremity of the spit was fastened a large circular box, or hollow wheel, something like the wire wheels which are so often appended to squirrel-cages; and in this wheel the Dog was accustomed to perform its daily task, by keeping it continually working. As the labour would be too great for a single Dog, it was usual to keep at least two animals for the purpose, and to make them relieve each other at regular intervals. The dogs were quite able to appreciate the lapse of time, and, if not relieved from their toils at the proper hour, would leap out of the wheel without orders, and force their companions to take their place, and complete their portion of the daily toil.

The dogs were also taken to church to serve as foot warmers. One story says that during service at a church in Bath, the Bishop of Gloucester gave a sermon and uttered the line "It was then that Ezekiel saw the wheel...". At the mention of the word "wheel" several turnspit dogs, who had been brought to church as foot warmers, ran for the door. However, this story is very likely a myth.

Queen Victoria kept retired turnspit dogs as pets.

== Appearance ==
Turnspit dogs were described as "long-bodied, crooked-legged and ugly dogs, with a suspicious, unhappy look about them". Delabere Blaine, a 19th-century veterinarian (and self-described "father of canine pathology"), classified the Turnspit dog as a variety of spaniel. Often they are shown with a white stripe down the center of their faces. According to Bingley's Memoirs of British Quadrupeds (1809):

The Turnspits are remarkable for their great length of body and short and usually crooked legs. Their colour is generally a dusky grey spotted with black or entirely black with the under parts whitish.

The turnspit dog is again described by H.D. Richardson in his book Dogs; Their Origin and Varieties (1847):

This dog although evidently a mongrel is nearer to the terriers than anything else and on this account I describe him among them. He is a small long backed cross made dog with the fore legs bent first inwards and then outwards he is frequently pied or glaucous coloured like the Great Danish dog and the harlequin terrier

The crooked leg is most likely owed to very distant ancestors as noted in Dogs And All About Them (1910), by Robert Leighton:

Among the distinct breeds kept in Egypt there was a massive wolf-dog, a large, heavily-built hound with drooping ears and a pointed head, at least two varieties of Greyhound used for hunting the gazelle, and a small breed of terrier or Turnspit, with short, crooked legs. This last appears to have been regarded as an especial household pet, for it was admitted into the living rooms and taken as a companion for walks out of doors. It was furnished with a collar of leaves, or of leather, or precious metal wrought into the form of leaves, and when it died it was embalmed. Every town throughout Egypt had its place of interment for canine mummies.

The gene for chondrodysplasia in various short-legged breeds has been confirmed to trace back to a single ancestral mutation.

== See also ==
- List of extinct dog breeds
