= Palm vinegar =

Palm vinegar or sugar palm vinegar refers to vinegar made from palm or sugar palm sap:

- Coconut vinegar, predominantly from the Philippines made from coconut water and coconut sap
- Nipa palm vinegar, from the Philippines made from Nypa fruticans sap
- Kaong palm vinegar, from the Philippines made from Arenga pinnata sap
