= Félix Laureano =

Filipino photographer

- Born: 1866; Patnongon, Antique, Captaincy General of the Philippines
- Died: December 18, 1952 (aged 86); Makati, Rizal, Philippines
- Occupation: Photographer

Félix Laureano (1866 – December 18, 1952) was a Filipino photographer. He is regarded to be the first professional Filipino photographer.

== Early life ==
Félix Laureano was born in 1866 in the town of Patnongon, Antique in Spanish Philippines to Zamora, Spain-born Augustinian priest Manuel Asensio and Norberta Laureano de los Santos. Felix grew up in the neighboring town of Bugasong where his father was assigned as the parish priest since 1860. He had four other siblings namely Santiago, Vicente, Jesus, and Maria.

== Career ==
Laureano grew up to be a photographer, opening his own studio in Iloilo City in the mid-1880s. He would move to Spain, but not before attending the Ateneo Municipal de Manila in 1883. At 21-years old, Laureano would hold his first exhibit in Madrid. He exhibited 40 photographs at the 1887 Exposicion General de Filipinas, a colonial showcase meant to feature the relationship of the Spanish Empire with its colony the Philippines. His works would also be featured at the 1888 Exposicion Universal de Barcelona. In Paris, Laureano is said to have studied photography and attended the 1889 Exposition Universelle. He returned to Barcelona to set up a studio in Las Ramblas. In 1892, Laureano returned to Iloilo for a brief visit where he established another studio along Calle Iznart. Upon his return in Barcelona, Laureano had been cited at the Exposicion National de Industrias Artisticas and was recognized by papers like La Solidaridad and La Vanguardia. He had two brothers and a sister.

Among Laureano's works include the Recuerdos de Filipinas (Memories of the Philippines), a photography book published in 1895 in Barcelona. The photography series En el baño (In the Bathroom) and Cuadrilleros (Laborers) are also his works.

He is regarded to be the first professional Filipino photographer and the first Filipino artist to "consciously use photography as a medium for art."

== Later life and death ==
Laureano returned to the Philippines from Spain during the Spanish Civil War of the 1930s. He lived in Iloilo City until the end of the Japanese occupation of the Philippines. He moved to Manila after World War II. Laureano died on December 18, 1952, at the Hospital Español de Santiago in Makati. He was 86 years old.
