= Indian bay leaf =

Indian bay leaf is a common name for several plants with leaves used in cooking and may refer to:

- Cinnamomum tamala, also known by the common name tejpatta
- Syzygium polyanthum, also known as Indonesian bay leaf
