= List of Spanish soups and stews =

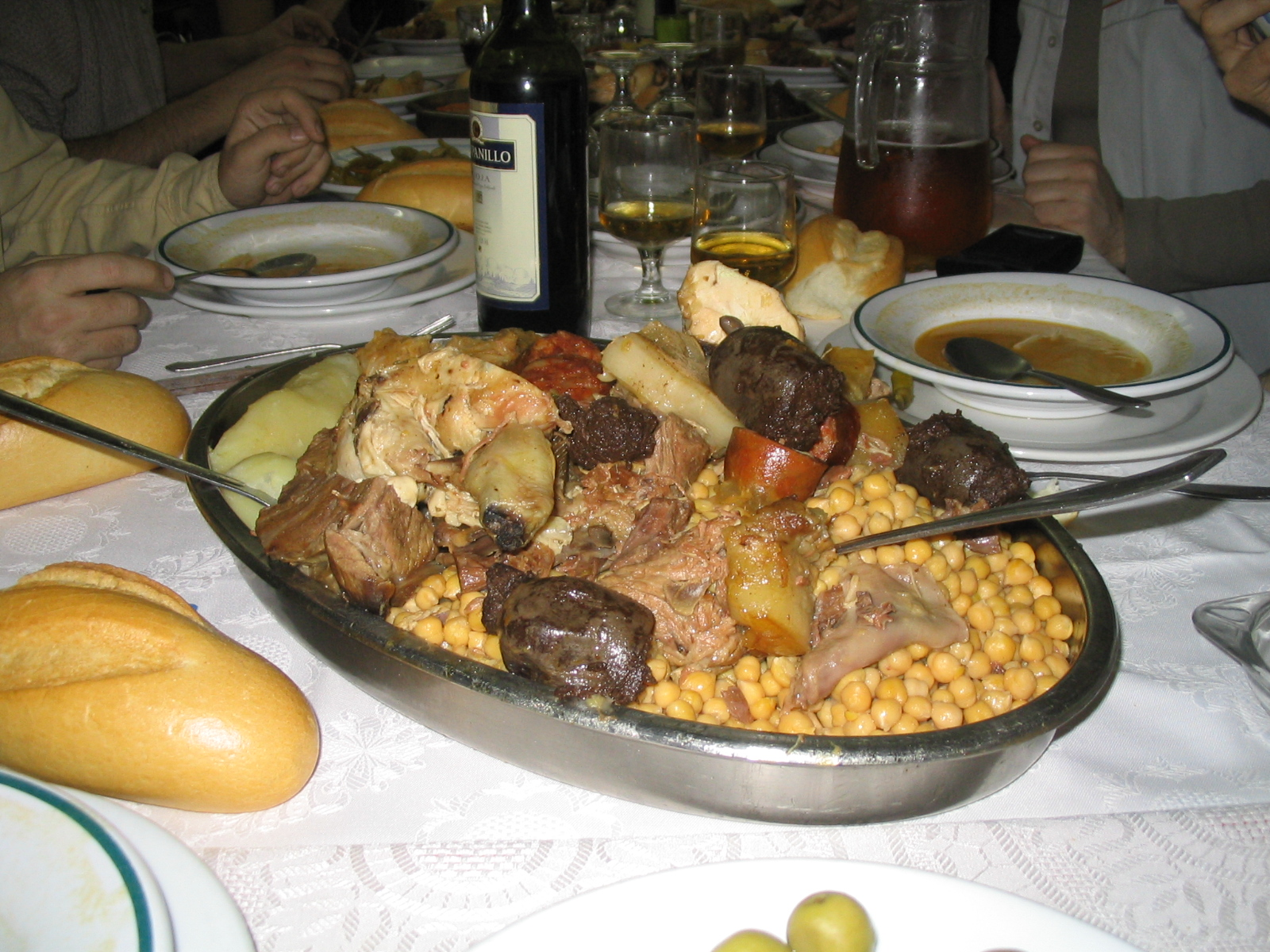
Cocido madrileño is a traditional chickpea-based stew from Madrid, Spain.

This is a list of Spanish soups and stews. Spanish cuisine is a way of preparing varied dishes, which is enriched by the culinary contributions of the various regions that make up the country. It is a cuisine influenced by the people who, throughout history, have conquered the territory of that country. Soup is a primarily liquid food, generally served warm (but may be cool or cold), that is made by combining ingredients such as meat and vegetables with stock, juice, water, or another liquid. Stew is a combination of solid food ingredients that have been cooked in liquid and served in the resultant gravy. Stews are typically cooked at a relatively low temperature (simmered, not boiled), allowing flavors to mingle.

== Spanish soups and stews ==
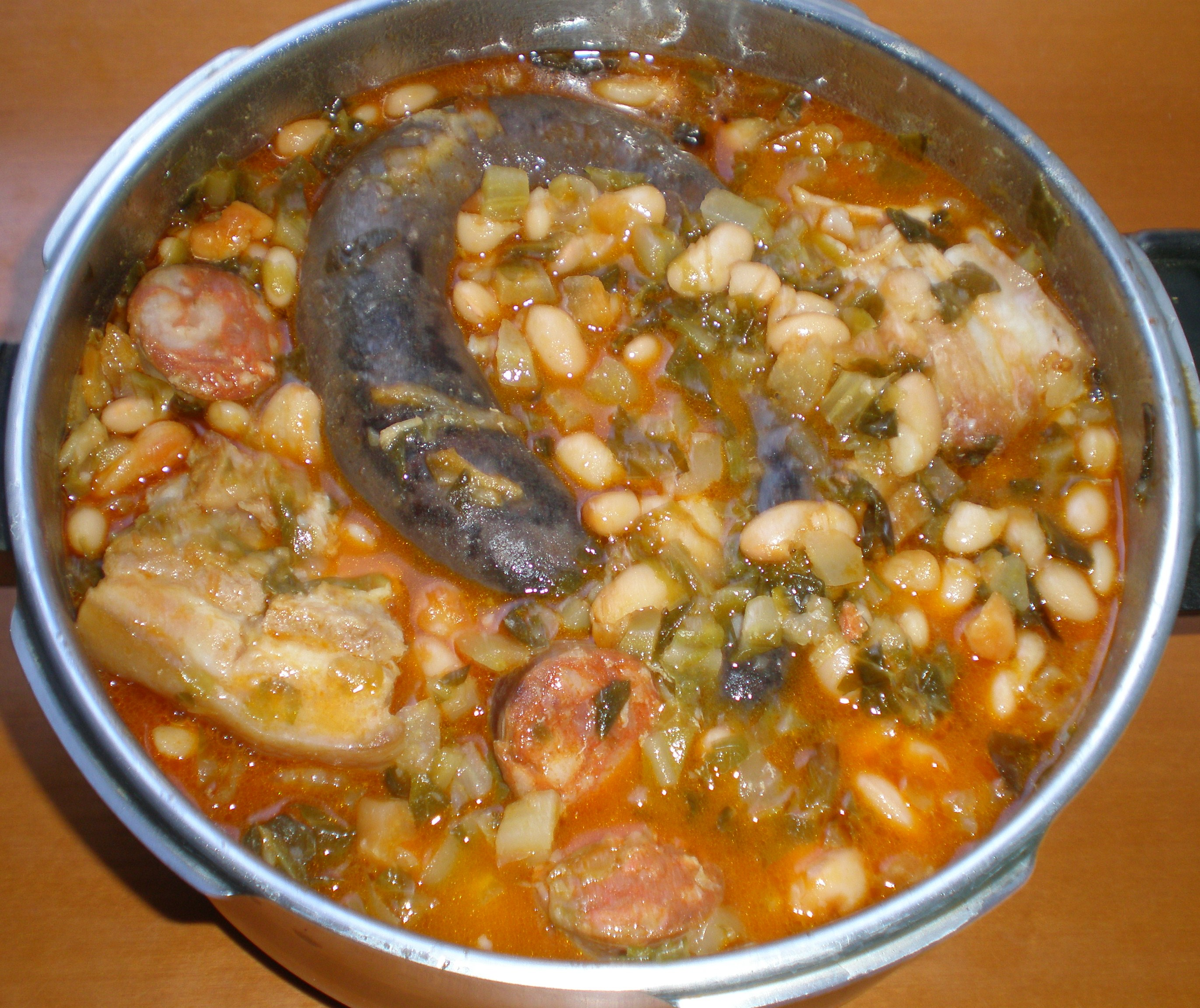
Cocido Montañés is originally from and most commonly found in Cantabria in northern Spain.

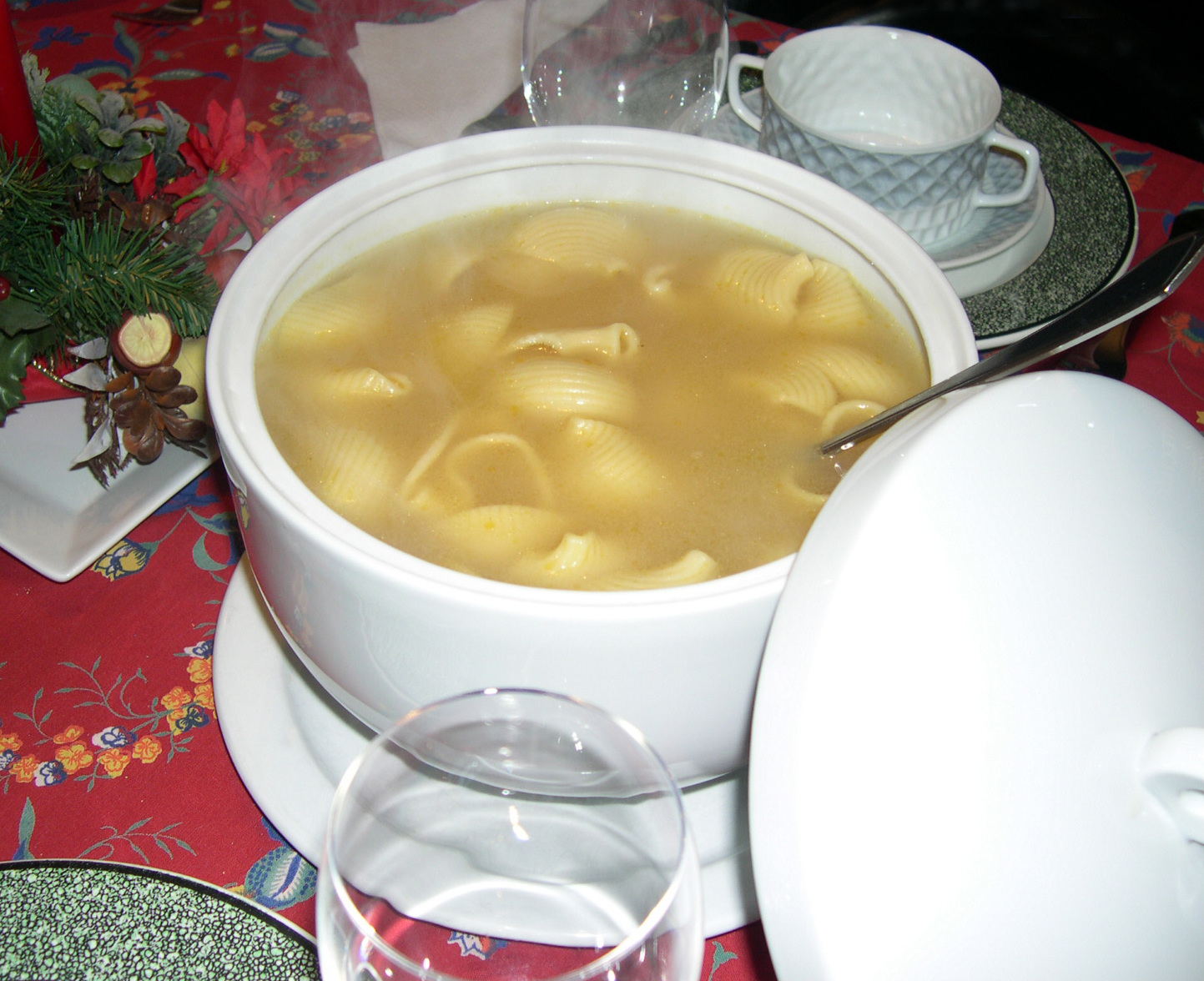
Escudella i carn d'olla is a traditional Catalan soup and stew.

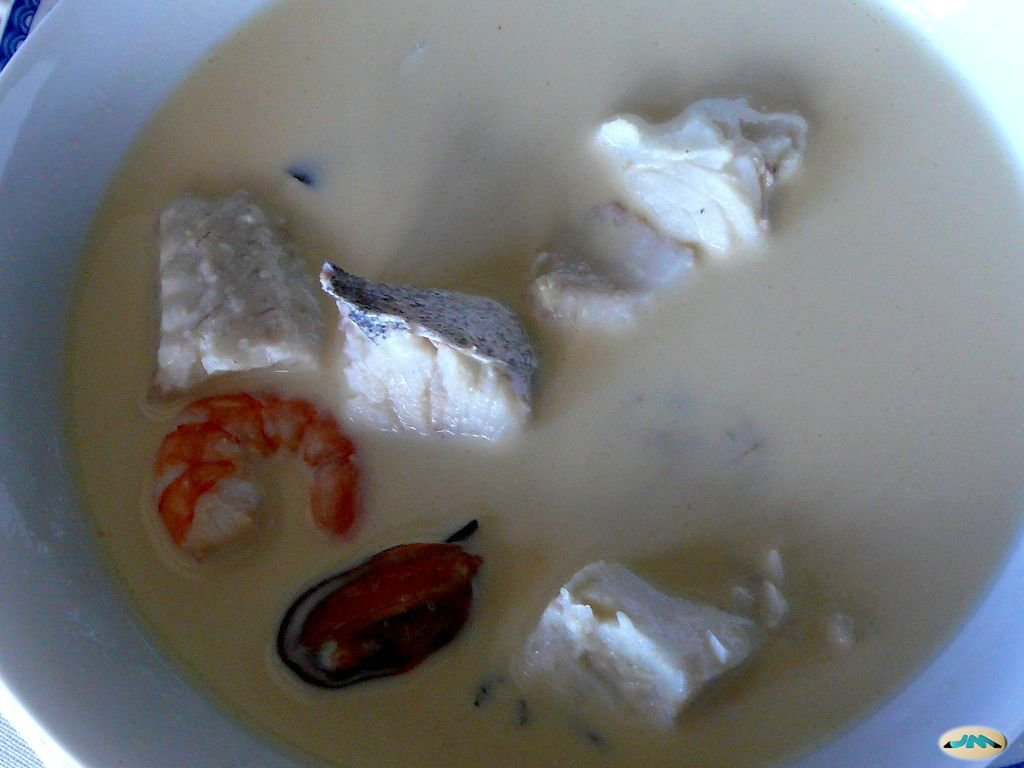
Gazpachuelo is a soup originating from Málaga, Spain and is a typical fisherman's dish

- Ajoblanco – Type of cold soup from Andalusia, Spain
- Alicot – Dish made with poutlry parts that is originally from southern France
- Caldillo de perro – Soup made with fish and oranges
- Caldo gallego – Soup dish from Galicia, Spain
- Caparrones – Caparrón stew
- Cozido – Dish made of various meats and vegetables of Spanish and Portuguese origins
- Cocido lebaniego – Traditional dish from Cantabria containing chickpeas
- Cocido madrileño – Spanish chickpea-based stew
- Cocido Montañés – Spanish bean stew
- Escudella i carn d'olla – Traditional Catalan and Valencian soup
- Fabada asturiana – Asturian bean stew
- Fabes con almejas
- Garbure – Stew in French cuisine
- Gazpacho – Spanish cold soup dish
- Gazpachuelo – Spanish soup
- Lobster stew – Various stews involving lobster
- Olla podrida – Spanish stew made with chickpeas and beans
- Ollada
- Piperade – Basque vegetable dish
- Pisto – Spanish dish
- Porra antequerana – Andalusian soup
- Salmorejo – Traditional soup from Andalusia, Spain
- Sopa de Gato – Thick soup from southern Spain
- Tuna pot – Fish and potato stew
- Zoque – Andalusian cold soup

== See also ==
- List of soups
- List of stews
