= Traditional Catalan Songs =

Catalan Songs

Studio album by Victoria de los Ángeles
- Released: 1991
- Recorded: Abbey Road Studios, London, England
- Genre: Catalan
- Label: Collins Classics, Brilliant Classics

Cançons Tradicionals Catalanes (Traditional Catalan songs) is a 1991 album of Catalan music by Victoria de los Ángeles, accompanied by Geoffrey Parsons. Recorded at the Abbey Road Studios, London, it was originally released on Collins Classics in 1992, and later re-released with the original texts and translations by Brilliant Classics.

== Track listing ==
1. El cant dels ocells
2. Muntanyes regalades
3. El mariner
4. El mestre
5. Mariagneta
6. Muntanyes del Canigó
7. El rossinyol
8. El bon caçador
9. La filla del marxant
10. L’hereu Riera
11. Els estudiantes de Tolosa
12. La ploma de perdiu
13. Els fadrins de Sant Boi
14. Caterina d’Alió
15. La Margarideta
16. La Mare de Déu
17. Josep i Maria
18. El noi de la mare
19. El desembre congelat
20. La dama d’Aragó
21. El testament d’Amèlia
22. La muller del gavatxot
23. La filadora
24. La presó de Lleida
25. Cançó del lladre
26. Els pobres traginers
27. La filla del carmesí
28. Els tres tambors
29. Els segadors
