= Llibre de Menescalia =

Veterinary reference about horses

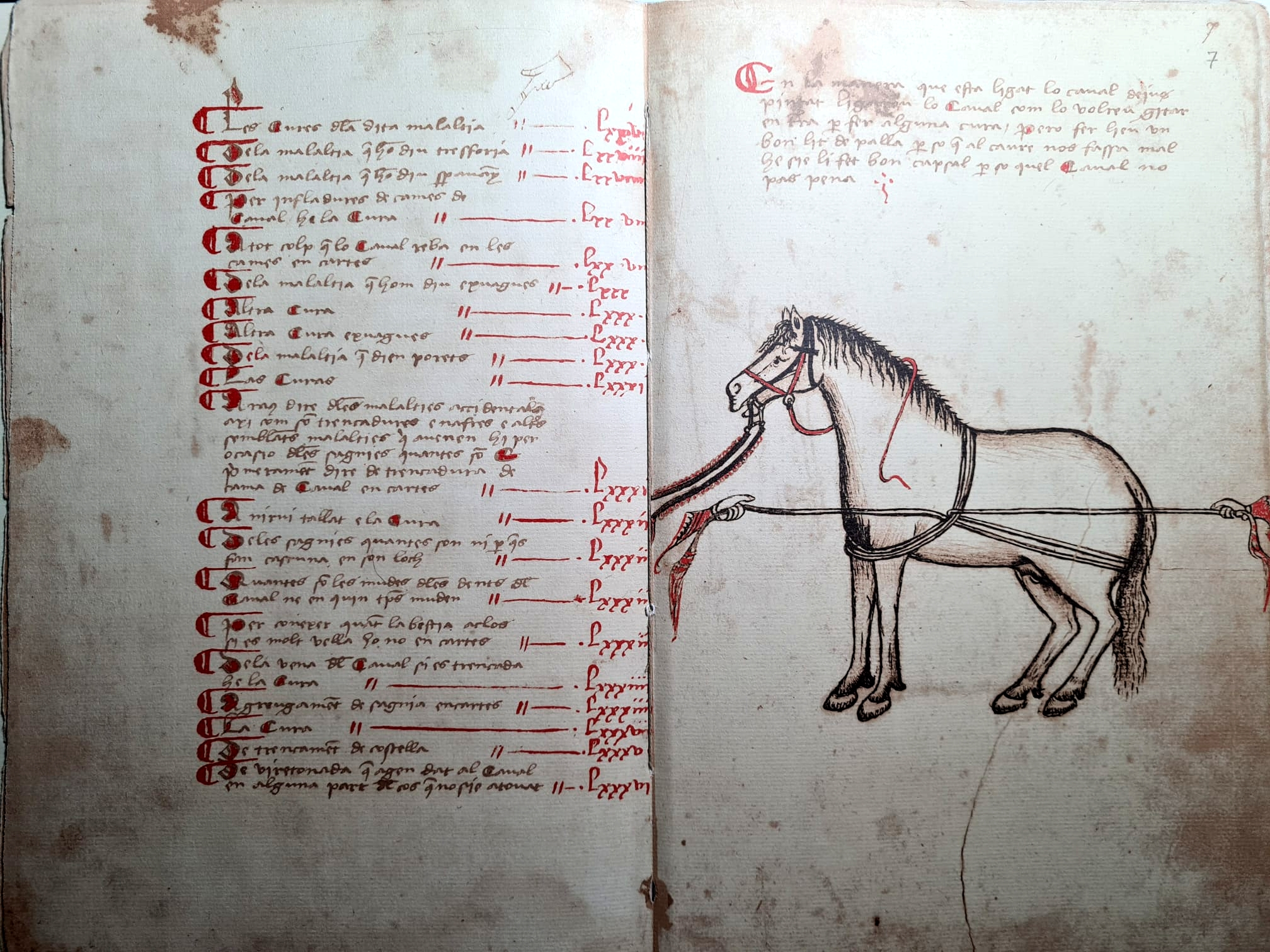

The Llibre de Menescalia is a 1436 Catalan manuscript by Manuel Dieç, translated into Spanish as Libro de Albeytería, that became the reference veterinary work about horses of the 15th and 16th centuries. At the time, the Catalan language had spread throughout the Mediterranean and was understood in a broad part of Europe for its similarity to Occitan and other languages. The book also had great success in Castile, for it was translated into Spanish in 1499 and republished in that language several times. The work consists of two books. The first, Book of Menescalia, deals with the external anatomy of the horse, qualities that must concur for the choice of the parents, coat, the way to raise the foal, etc. The second, Treatise of the Menescalia of the mules, is about the mules widely used in Catalonia.

== First editions ==
Manuel Dieç compiled, by order of Alfonso V, between 1424 and 1436, the information about equine veterinary medicine provided by the most famous professors in the army and the classical and modern texts he could find, forming with them the Book of the Art of Menescalia. An Aragonese translation was published in Zaragoza by Pablo Hurus in 1499. Dieç's book became the reference work in equine medicine in the 15th century and 16th century. The original manuscript of 1436 was translated into Spanish in 1499, and then into Aragonese, Portuguese, Neapolitan, and French, and is cited as a reference in works printed in Paris, Mexico, Bologna, and Nuremberg.

== Content ==
The manuscript, of which there is some copy extant, consists of two books. The first, Llibre de menescalia (Book of Menescalia), is longer, more than ninety chapters, most of which deal with the external anatomy of the horse, qualities that must concur for the choice of the parents, coat, the way of breeding the foal, etc. The second, Tractat de la menescalia de les mules (Treatise on the Menescalia of Mules), is about the mule, qualities related to its exterior and how to administer their food. It emphasizes the clarity and good method with which the author set out the same ideas, as well its being the first work of these characteristics to tie the horse with astrology, although it did not contain any worthy advance of consideration in the opinion of Pedro Darder. In all probability the author knew other texts on the subject, such as Cirujia del cavall (Horse Surgery) by Gallien Corretger, Giordano Ruffo's Treatise on Menescalia, and The Book of Horses from Theodoric Borgognoni. The Aragonese Sos Martín Martínez de Ampiés translated this book into Spanish and had it printed in Toledo in 1507.

His work inspired authors such as Salvador Vila with Dels nodriments dals cavalls i de les mules, Juan Álvarez de Salamiellas (Libro de menescalia y de albeitería y física de las bestias), and Rinni (Anatomia del cavalo infirmitate i suo remedyii). That book was spread in handwritten copies and also printed in the fifteenth and sixteenth centuries in its original Catalan version (Barcelona 1515 and 1523) and in Spanish (Zaragoza 1495, 1499, and 1545; Toledo 1507, 1511, and 1515), etc.

== Author of the Book of the Coch ==
We know because it is written in the title of the printed book that the author of the Llibre del Coch was called "Master Robert", and that he was a cook of "King Ferdinand of Naples", but we do not know if he was born in Nola, in Noia, or elsewhere, nor "does anyone know who was this personage" only that he was "a native of Catalonia".

The chapter “De offici de mestre de Estable” (that describes some obligations of the charge: "Master of horse keepers"), says clearly: “E de aquesta materia nom curaré més de parlar-ne ara perquè en lo llibre de Menescalia ja molt largament n'he parlat” (“about this matter I will be careful of not speaking now because in the book of Menescalia I have already spoken very lengthily"), therefore it can be supposed that the author of the “Llibre del Coch” and the author of the “Libre of Menescalia” are the same person: Manuel Dieç, butler of the king Alfonso the Magnanimous. At a later date, Mestre Robert de Nola (if he ever existed, for the name could be invented) would have copied the lost original manuscript by Manuel Dieç.

== Bibliography ==
- CIFUENTES, Lluís i FERRAGUD, Carmel: El Libre de la menescalia de Manuel Dies: de espejo de caballeros a manual de albéitares, Asclepio, Revista de Historia de la Medicina y de la Ciencia, Vol 51, n 1, (1999), pàg. 93-127; Edita Consejo Superior de Investigaciones Científicas; ISSN 1988-3102
- Manuel Díez i el seu manual de menescalia | Sciència.cat (sciencia.cat) c.
