= Mató de Pedralbes =

Catalan traditional dessert

- Alternative names: Mató de monja
- Type: Custard
- Place of origin: Spain
- Region or state: Catalonia
- Main ingredients: milk

Mató de Pedralbes (Catalan pronunciation: [məˈto ðə pəˈðɾalβəs]) or mató de monja, is a typical dessert from Barcelona (in Catalonia, Spain) made with flavoured and sweetened milk. The dish is believed to have been created in the nineteenth century, by nuns of the convent in Barcelona's prestigious Pedralbes neighbourhood. It was intended as a richer, finer alternative to the older and popular crema catalana. Despite its name, this dessert bears no relationship to Catalan mató cheese, as mató ('curd' in Catalan) here refers to the shape and texture of this dessert taken out of the mould.

== See also ==
- Catalan cuisine
- List of custard desserts
