= Pilota =

Pilota (Catalan and Basque for ball) may refer to:

- Valencian pilota, a traditional handball ball game played in Valencia, Spain
- Basque pilota, ball games played in Basque Country, Spain
- Pilota (food), a large meatball used in a traditional Catalan meat and vegetable stew
