= El Noi de la Mare =

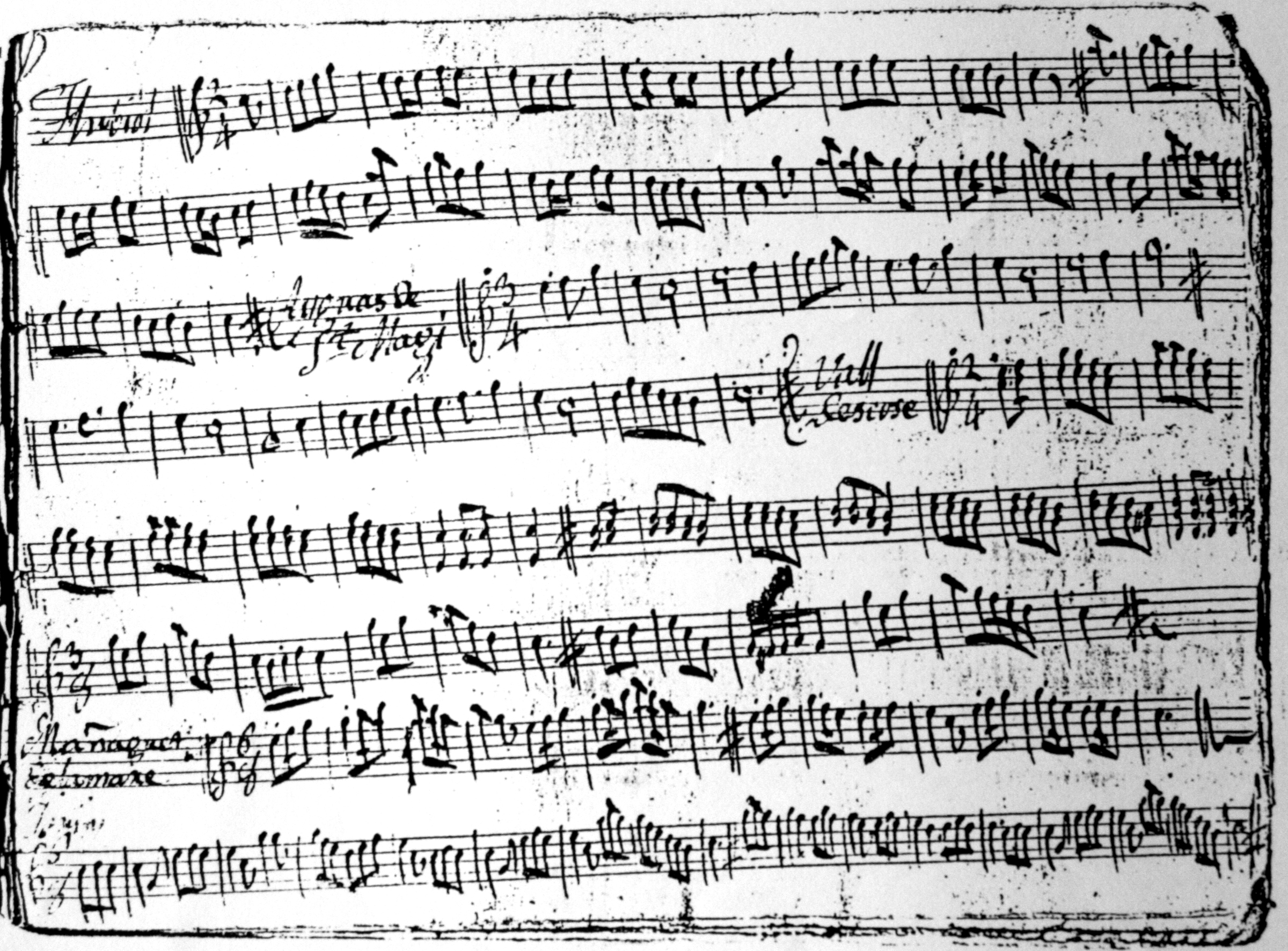

Song
- Language: Catalan
- English title: The Child of the Mother
- Genre: Folk music
- Songwriter: Traditional

"El Noi de la Mare"
Catalan folk Christmas song (instrumental).

El Noi de la Mare (Eastern Catalan: [əl ˈnɔj ðə lə ˈma.ɾə], Western Catalan: [el ˈnɔj ðe la ˈma.ɾe]; "The Child of the Mother") is a traditional Catalan Christmas song. The song was made famous outside Spain by Andrés Segovia who used to perform Miguel Llobet's guitar transcription as an encore.

== Lyrics ==
The main stanza has four verses and begins mostly with Què li darem an el Noi de la Mare? In some traditional ways of singing the song every pair of verses is repeated twice. The first stanza of a common version is:

Què li darem an el Noi de la Mare?
Què li darem que li sàpiga bo?
Panses i figues i nous i olives
Panses i figues i mel i mató

What shall we give to the Mother's Child?
What shall we give that he will find tasty?
Raisins and figs and walnuts and olives
Raisins and figs and honey and mató

The word “an” is a non-standard, colloquial, and outdated form of the preposition “a” while the verb “dar” (to give) is obsolete except in certain expressions; in modern Catalan, “donar” is used instead.

=== Variants ===
The text exists in other slightly different variants.

Classical vocal arrangements have been made by Joaquín Nin-Culmell for soprano and John Rutter for choir.

A version of this in English has been reworked and developed to produce the carol "What Shall we Give?" as sung by the Mormon Tabernacle Choir.

=== Extended version ===
Catalan original

I
Què li darem, an el Noi de la Mare?
Què li darem, que li sàpiga bo?
Panses i figues i nous i olives
Panses i figues i mel i mató.

II
Què li darem, al Fillet de Maria
Què li darem al formós Infantó
Li darem panses amb unes balances
li darem figues amb un paneró.

III
Tam patatam que les figues són verdes,
tam patatam que ja maduraran
Si no maduren el dia de Pasqua
Maduraràn el dia de Rams.

IV
Una cançó jo també cantaria,
una cançó ben bonica d'amor
I que n'és treta d'una donzelleta
Que n'és la Verge, Mare del Senyor.

V
No ploris, no, manyaguet de la mare,
No ploris, no, ai alè del meu cor!
Cançó és aquesta que al Noi de la Mare
Cançó és aquesta que li agrada molt.

Central Catalan (Eastern) IPA (Note: See Help:IPA/Catalan and Catalan phonology.)

I
[ˈkɛ ɫi ð̞əˈɾɛm ən əɫ ˈnɔj ð̞ə ɫə ˈma.ɾə]
[ˈkɛ ɫi ð̞əˈɾɛm kə ɫi ˈsa.pi.ɣ̞ə ˈβ̞ɔ]
[ˈpan.səz i ˈfi.ɣ̞əz i ˈnɔwz i uˈɫi.β̞əs]
[ˈpan.səz i ˈfi.ɣ̞əz i ˈmɛɫ i məˈt̪o]

II
[ˈkɛ ɫi ð̞əˈɾɛm əɫ fiˈʎɛd̪ d̪ə məˈɾi.ə]
[ˈkɛ ɫi ð̞əˈɾɛm əɫ furˈmoz iɱ.fən̪ˈt̪o]
[ɫi ð̞əˈɾɛm ˈpan.səz əm.b‿u.nəz bəˈɫan.səz]
[ɫi ð̞əˈɾɛm ˈfi.ɣ̞əz əm.b‿um pə.nəˈɾo]

III
[ˈt̪am pə.t̪əˈt̪am kə ɫəs ˈfi.ɣ̞əs ˈsom ˈbɛr.d̪əs]
[ˈt̪am pə.t̪əˈt̪am kə ˈʒa mə.ð̞u.ɾəˈɾan]
[si ˈno məˈð̞u.ɾən əɫ ˈd̪i.ə ð̞ə ˈpas.kwə]
[mə.ð̞u.ɾəˈɾan əɫ ˈd̪i.ə ð̞ə ˈrams]

IV
[ˈu.nə kənˈso ˈʒɔ t̪əmˈbe kən̪.t̪əˈɾi.ə]
[ˈu.nə kənˈso ˈβ̞em buˈni.kə ð̞‿əˈmor]
[i kə ˈn‿es ˈt̪ɾɛ.t̪ə ˈð̞‿u.nə ð̞un.zəˈʎɛ.t̪ə]
[kə ˈn‿ez ɫə ˈβ̞ɛr.ʒə ˈma.ɾə ð̞əɫ səˈɲo]

V
[ˈno ˈpɫɔ.ɾis | ˈno | mə.ɲəˈɣ̞ɛd̪ d̪ə ɫə ˈma.ɾə]
[ˈno ˈpɫɔ.ɾis | ˈno | ˈaj əˈɫɛ ð̞əɫ ˈmew ˈkɔr]
[kənˈso ˈez əˈkɛs.t̪ə kə əɫ ˈnɔj ð̞ə ɫə ˈma.ɾə]
[kənˈso ˈez əˈkɛs.t̪ə kə ɫi əˈɣ̞ɾa.ð̞ə ˈmoɫ]

North-Western Catalan (Western) IPA

I
[ˈke ɫi ð̞aˈɾem ˈan eɫ ˈnɔj ð̞e ɫa ˈma.ɾe]
[ˈke ɫi ð̞aˈɾem ke ɫi ˈsa.pi.ɣ̞a ˈβ̞ɔ]
[ˈpan.sez i ˈfi.ɣ̞ez i ˈnɔwz i oˈɫi.β̞es]
[ˈpan.sez i ˈfi.ɣ̞ez i ˈmɛɫ i maˈt̪o]

II
[ˈke ɫi ð̞aˈɾem aɫ fiˈʎed̪ d̪e maˈɾi.a]
[ˈke ɫi ð̞aˈɾem aɫ forˈmoz iɱ.fan̪ˈt̪o]
[ɫi ð̞aˈɾem ˈpan.sez am.b‿u.nez baˈɫan.sez]
[ɫi ð̞aˈɾem ˈfi.ɣ̞ez am.b‿um pa.neˈɾo]

III
[ˈt̪am pa.t̪aˈt̪am ke ɫes ˈfi.ɣ̞es ˈsom ˈbɛr.d̪es]
[ˈt̪am pa.t̪aˈt̪am ke ˈʒa ma.ð̞u.ɾaˈɾan]
[si ˈno maˈð̞u.ɾen eɫ ˈd̪i.a ð̞e ˈpas.kwa]
[ma.ð̞u.ɾaˈɾan eɫ ˈd̪i.a ð̞e ˈrams]

IV
[ˈu.na kanˈso ˈjɔ t̪amˈbe kan̪.t̪aˈɾi.a]
[ˈu.na kanˈso ˈβ̞em boˈni.ka ð̞‿aˈmor]
[i ke ˈn‿es ˈt̪ɾe.t̪a ˈð̞‿u.na ð̞on.zeˈʎe.t̪a]
[ke ˈn‿ez ɫa ˈβ̞ɛr.ʒe ˈma.ɾe ð̞eɫ seˈɲo]

V
[ˈno ˈpɫɔ.ɾis | ˈno | ma.ɲaˈɣ̞ed̪ d̪e ɫa ˈma.ɾe]
[ˈno ˈpɫɔ.ɾis | ˈno | ˈaj aˈɫe ð̞eɫ ˈmew ˈkɔr]
[kanˈso ˈez aˈkes.t̪a ke aɫ ˈnɔj ð̞e ɫa ˈma.ɾe]
[kanˈso ˈez aˈkes.t̪a ke ɫi aˈɣ̞ɾa.ð̞a ˈmoɫ]

English translation

I
What shall we give to the Mother's Child?
What shall we give that he will find tasty?
Raisins and figs and walnuts and olives
Raisins and figs and honey and mató.

II
What shall we give to Mary's Little Son?
What shall we give to the beautiful Little Child?
We shall give him raisins with a pair of scales,
We shall give him figs with a little basket.

III
Tam patatam, for the figs are green,
Tam patatam, but they will ripen yet.
If they do not ripen by Easter Day,
They will ripen on Palm Sunday.

IV
I too would sing a song,
A very beautiful song of love;
And it is drawn from a young maiden,
Who is the Virgin, Mother of the Lord.

V
Do not cry, no, little darling of your mother,
Do not cry, no, oh, breath of my heart!
This is the song that the Mother's Child,
This is the song that he loves so much.

== Recordings ==
- (anon.) Title track of El Noi de la Mare, Mother and Son Zefiro Torna, Cécile Kempenaers, Els van Laethem, Jan van Elsacker and Lieven Termont (2006)
- (anon.) Catalan Songs (Victoria de Los Angeles album)
- (anon.) José Carreras Sings Catalan Songs
- Kim Robertson (musician), Christmas Lullaby II (2017), Gourd Music

== See also ==
- List of Christmas carols
