= Catalan cuisine =

Mediterranean style of cuisine from Catalonia

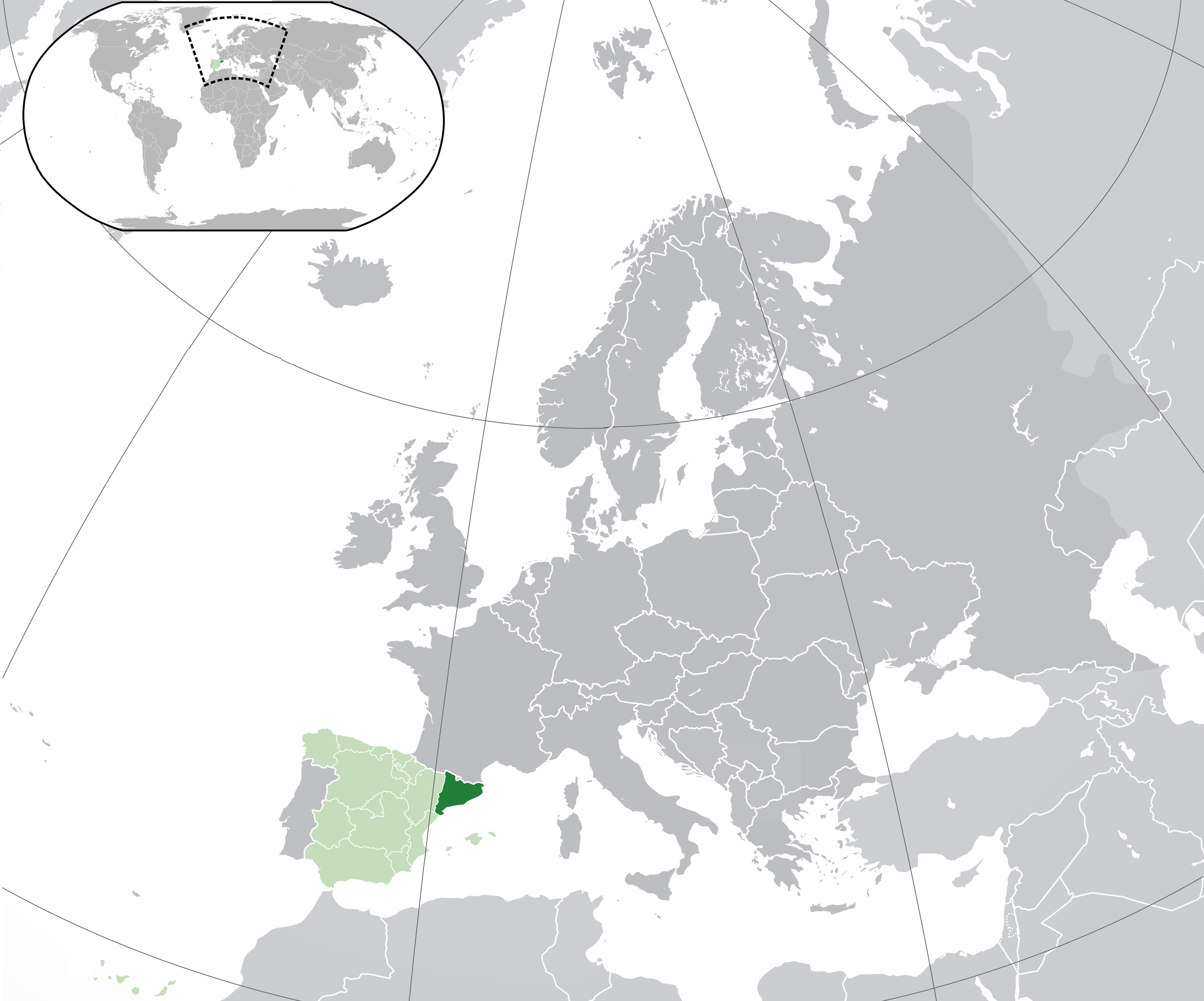
Location of Catalonia (dark green) in Spain and Europe. Most of its territory (except the Val d'Aran) is part of the Mediterranean Basin, and its cuisine mainly belongs to the culinary tradition of this area.

Catalan cuisine is the cooking traditions and practices from Catalonia. It may also refer to the shared cuisine of Northern Catalonia and Andorra, the second of which has a similar cuisine to that of the neighbouring Alt Urgell and Cerdanya comarques, often referred to as "Catalan mountain cuisine". It is considered a part of western Mediterranean cuisine.

== History ==
There are several Catalan language cookbooks from the Middle Ages that are known to modern scholars. The Llibre del Coch (1520) was one of the most influential cookbooks of Renaissance Spain. It includes several sauce recipes made with ingredients such as ginger, mace powder (flor de macis), cinnamon, saffron, cloves (clauells de girofle), wine and honey. Salsa de pagó took its name from the peacock (Catalan: el paó) that it was intended to be served with, but could accompany any type of poultry, and was part of the medieval Christmas meal. Salsa mirraust (or mirausto alla catalana as it's called in the Cuoco Napoletano) was half-roasted (mi-raust) poultry that was finished in a salsa thickened with egg yolks, toasted almonds and breadcrumbs. In the version of the recipe from the 14th-century Llibre de Sent Soví, the sauce is thickened with mashed poultry liver instead of egg yolks.

Hippocras (pimentes de clareya) was spiced wine made with cinnamon, cloves, ginger, pepper, honey and wine pressed through a manega, a pastry bag-shaped cloth that was originally designed by Hippocrates to filter water.

The 17th century manuscript El llibre de la Cuina de Scala-Dei, written at the Cartoixa d'Escaladei, contains basic recipes such as cereal porridges that go back to Roman times.

== Basic ingredients ==
Catalan cuisine relies heavily on ingredients popular along the Mediterranean coast, including fresh vegetables (especially tomato, garlic, eggplant (aubergine), capsicum, and artichoke), wheat products (bread, pasta), Arbequina olive oils, wines, legumes (beans, chickpeas), mushrooms (particularly wild mushrooms), nuts (pine nuts, hazelnuts and almonds), all sorts of pork preparations (sausage from Vic, ham), sheep and goats' cheese, poultry, lamb, many types of fish like sardine, anchovy, tuna, and cod and other seafood like prawns, squid, sea snails and sea urchins.

Traditional Catalan cuisine ranges from pork-intensive dishes cooked in the inland part of the region (Catalonia is one of the main producers of swine products in Spain) to fish-based recipes along the coast. These meat and seafood elements are frequently combined in the Catalan version of surf and turf, known as mar i muntanya, in dishes such as chicken with lobster (pollastre amb llagosta), chicken with crayfish (pollastre amb escarmalans), rice with meat and seafood (arròs mar i muntanya) and cuttlefish with meatballs (sípia amb mandonguilles).

The cuisine includes many preparations that mix sweet and savoury and stews with sauces based upon botifarra (pork sausage) and the characteristic picada (ground almonds, hazelnuts, pine nuts, etc. sometimes with garlic, herbs, and biscuits).

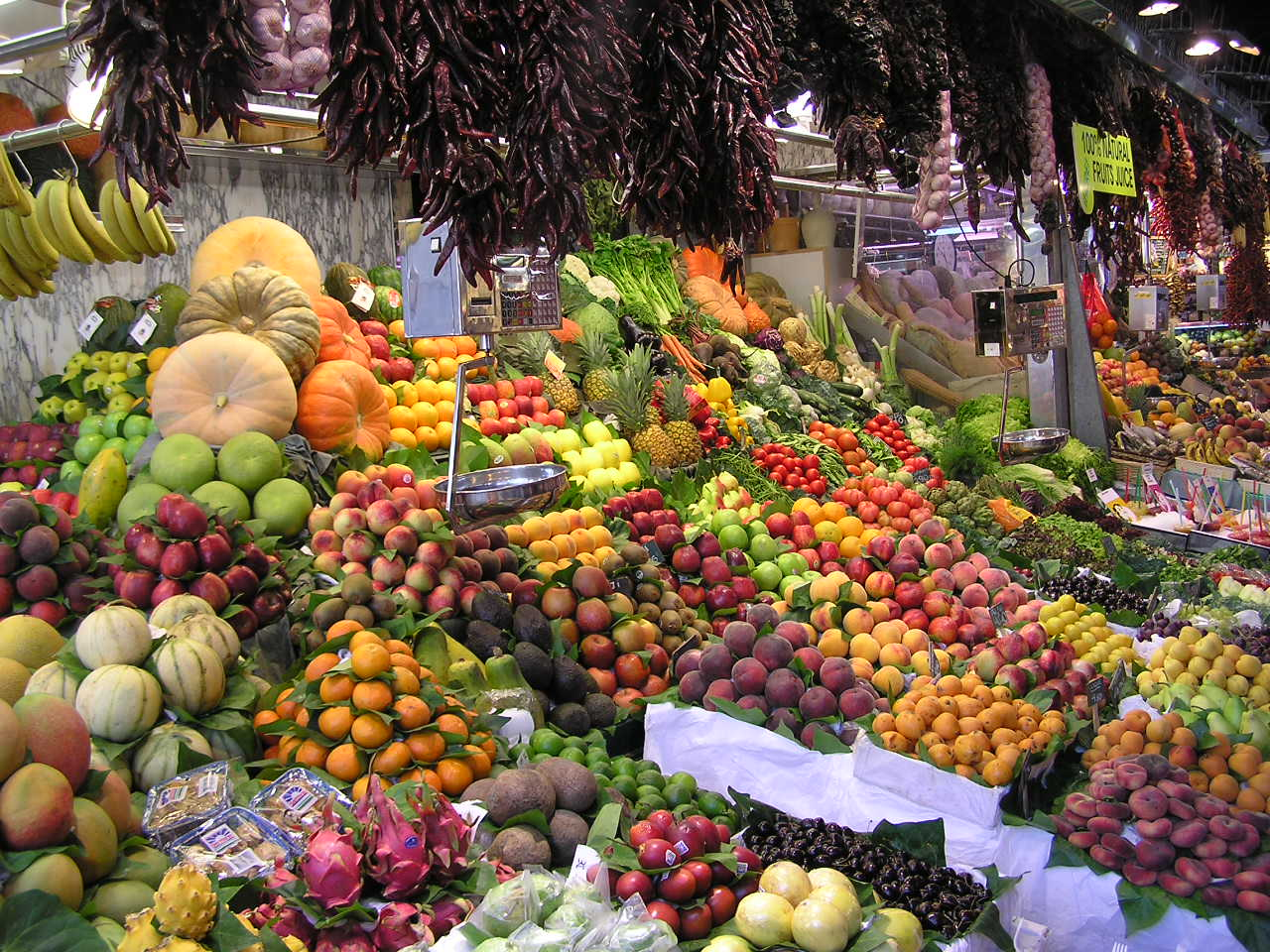
Fruits from La Boqueria Market, Barcelona

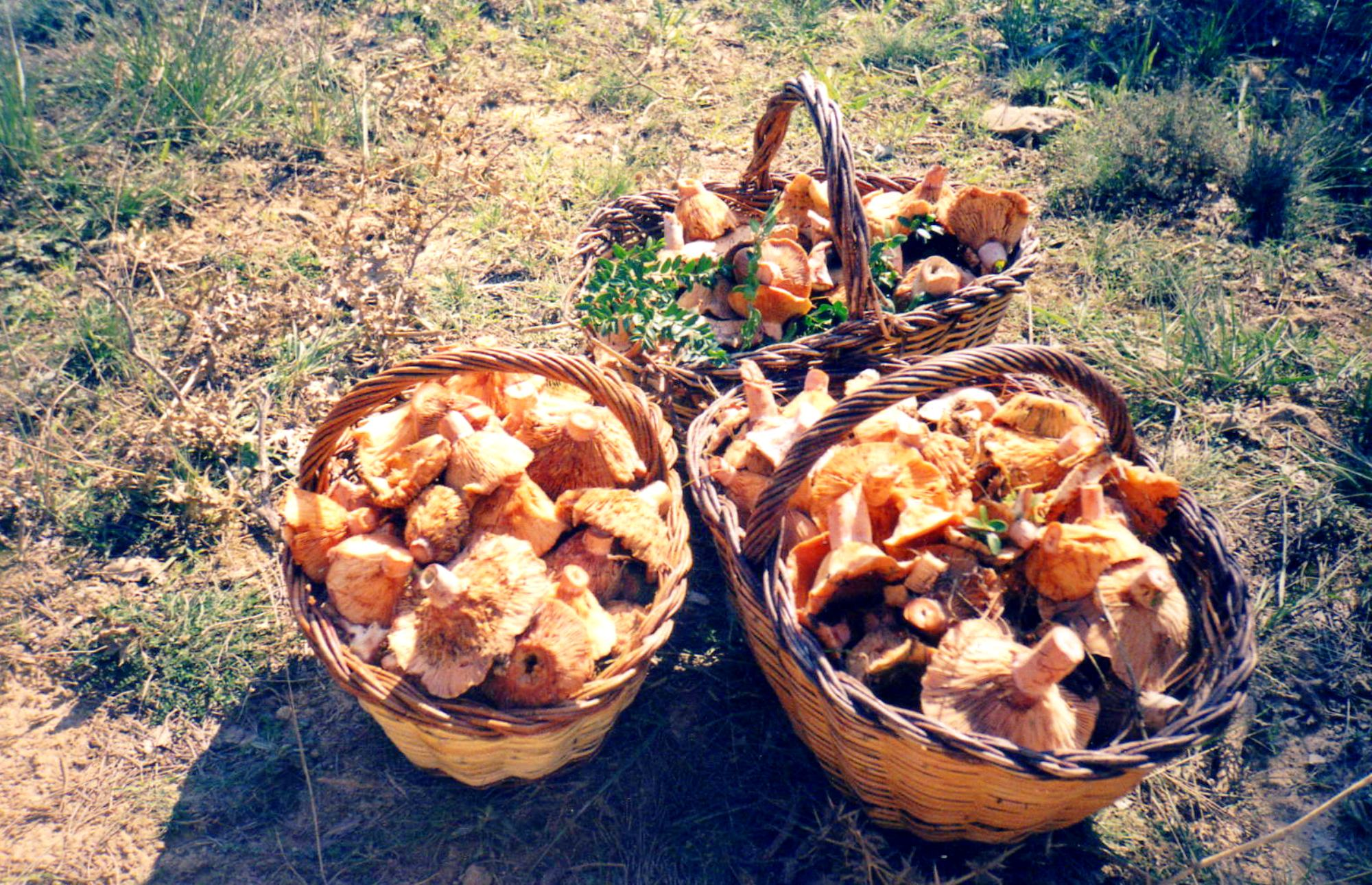
Rovellons or Pinatells, a wild mushroom

== Savoury dishes ==
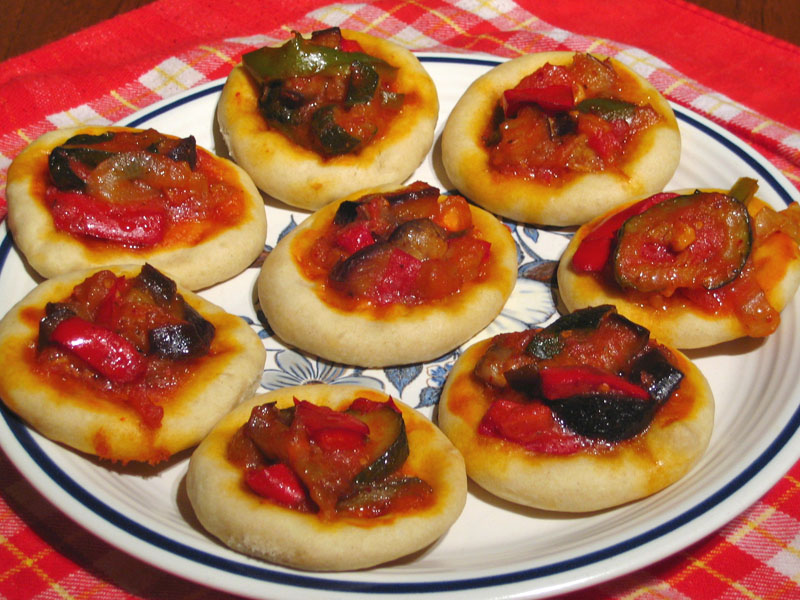
Coques

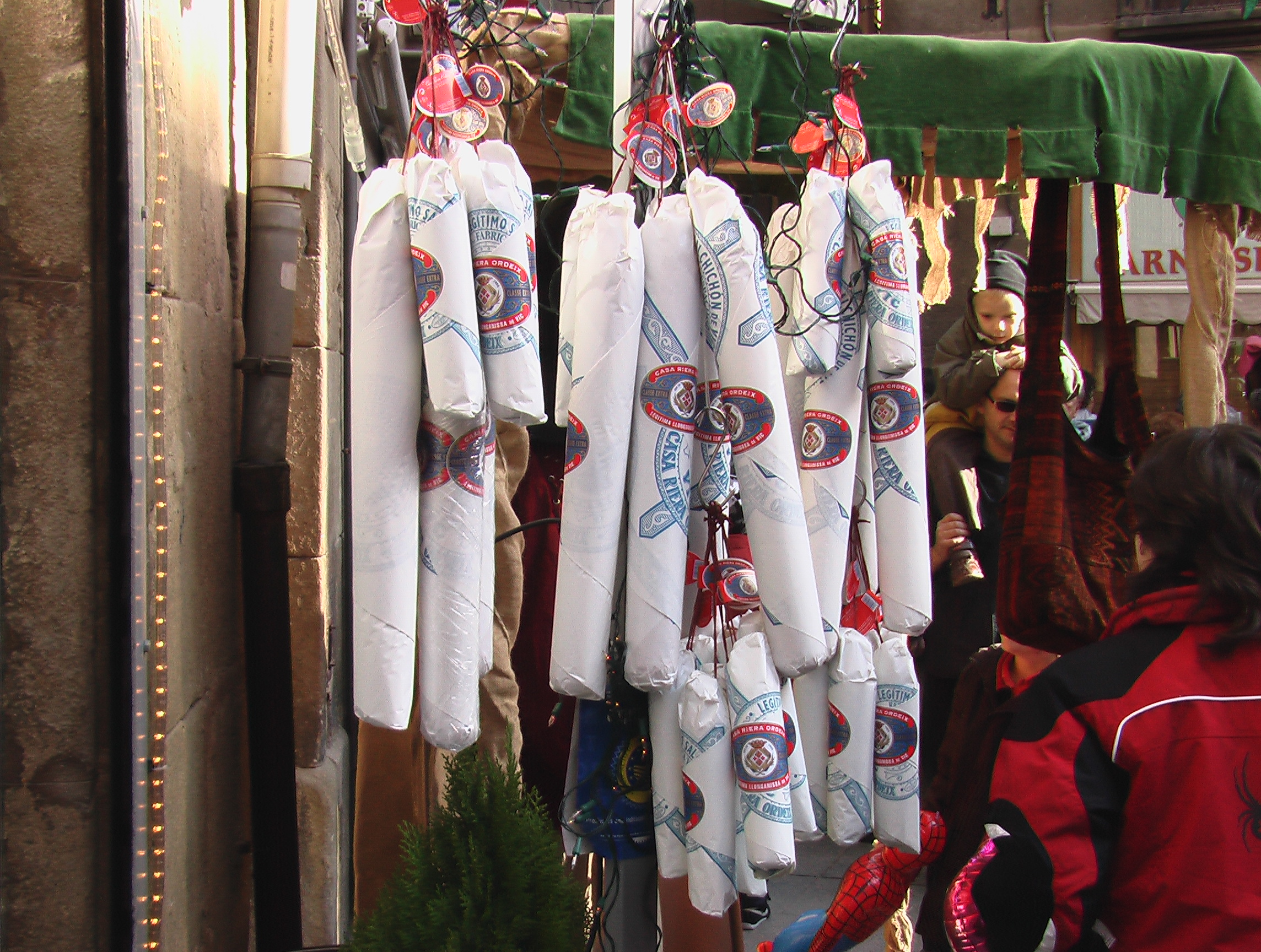
Cured sausage (llonganissa) from Vic

- Catalan-style cod (with raisins and pine nuts)
- Escalivada (various grilled vegetables)
- Escudella (a stew; it may be served as soup with pasta and minced meats and vegetables, or as the soup first and then the rest)
- Fricandó
- Ollada (meat and vegetable stew)
- Esqueixada (salted cod salad with tomato and onion)
- Mongetes amb botifarra (beans and pork sausage)
- Pa amb tomàquet (bread smeared with tomato and oil, and sometimes garlic)
- Tonyina en escabetx (tuna escabeche)
- Suquet (a seafood casserole)
- Savoury coca
- Mar i muntanya ("sea and mountain") dishes, which combine meat and seafood
- Embotits, a generic name for different kinds of cured pork meat, including fuet (a characteristic type of dried sausage), salchichón or llonganissa (salami) and different kinds of cold-cut botifarra
- Calçot (specially cultivated onion, grilled and served as a "calçotada")
- Caragols a la llauna (cooked snails)
- Sonsos (Gymnammodytes cicerelus, also known as Mediterranean sand eel, sonso in Catalan, and barrinaire or enfú in Menorca, is a fish in the family Ammodytidae. It is the only species of this family in the Mediterranean Sea.)

== Sauces and condiments ==
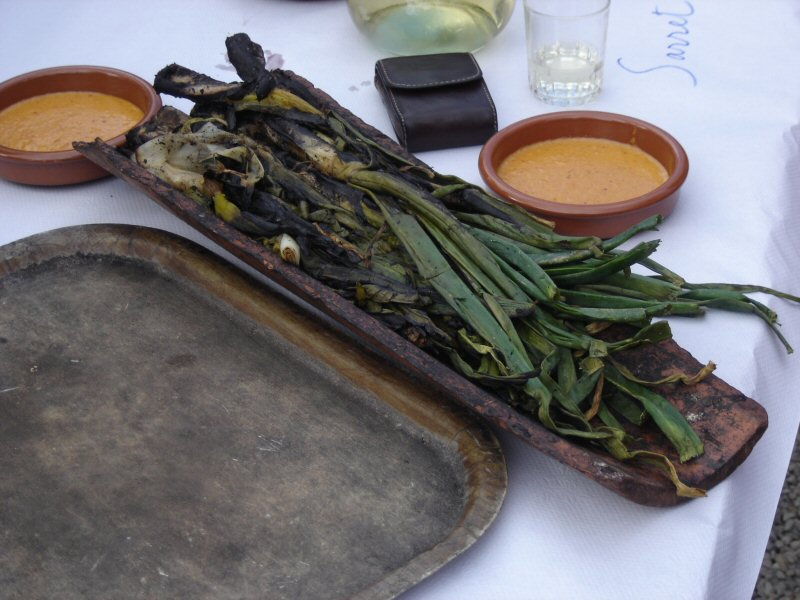
Calçots with Romesco sauce for dipping

- Allioli, a thick sauce made of garlic and olive oil, used with grilled meats or vegetables, and some dishes. Allioli means garlic (all) and (i) oil (oli) in Catalan.
- Samfaina, also called tomacat or pebrots amb tomàquet. It is a variety of Occitan ratatouille or Spanish pisto.
- Romesco or salvitxada (made from almonds, hazelnuts, garlic, bread, vinegar, tomatoes, olive oil and dried red peppers) from Valls.
- Xató, a variety of salvitxada without tomatoes.

== Sweets and desserts ==
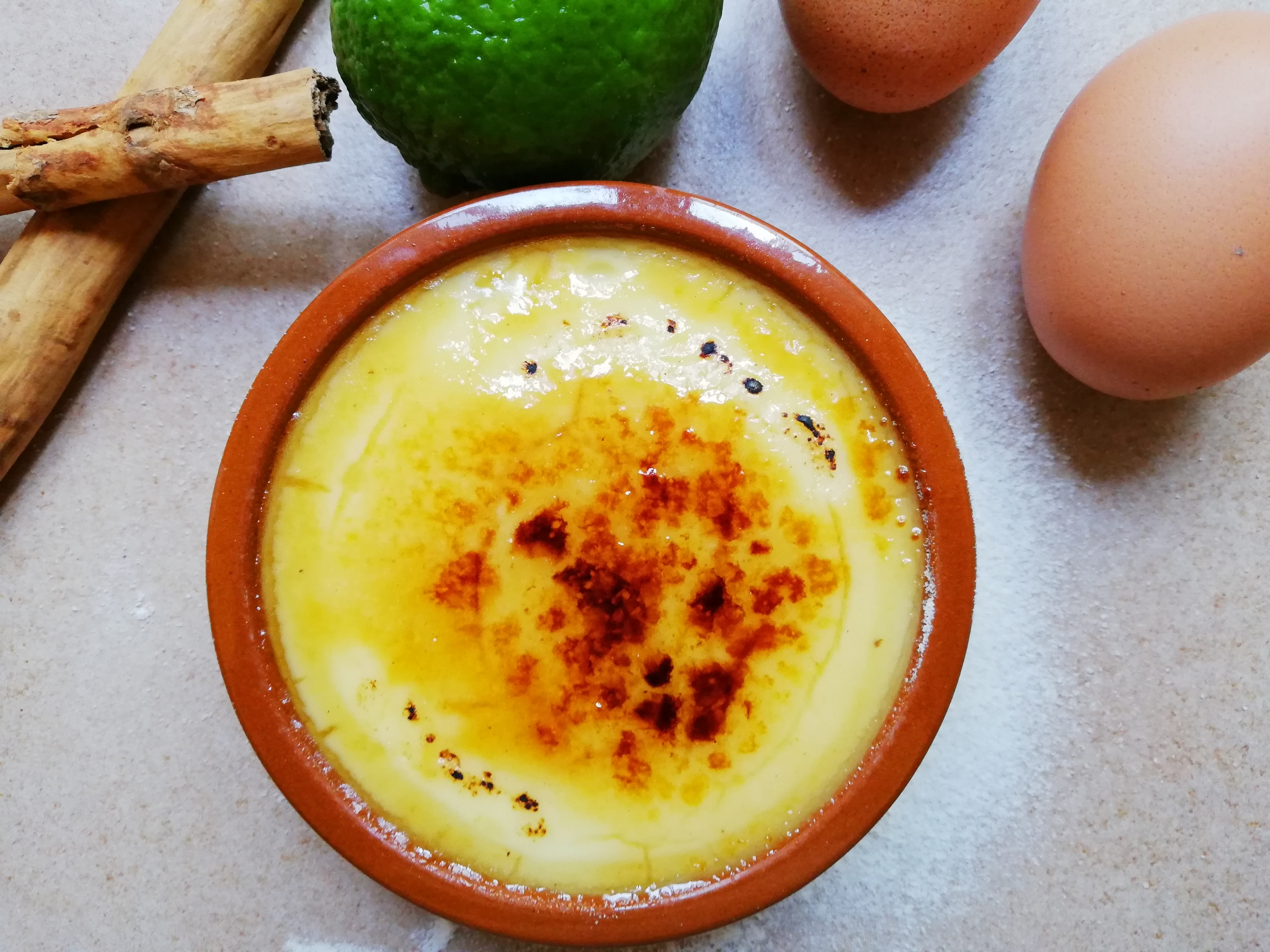
A crema catalana

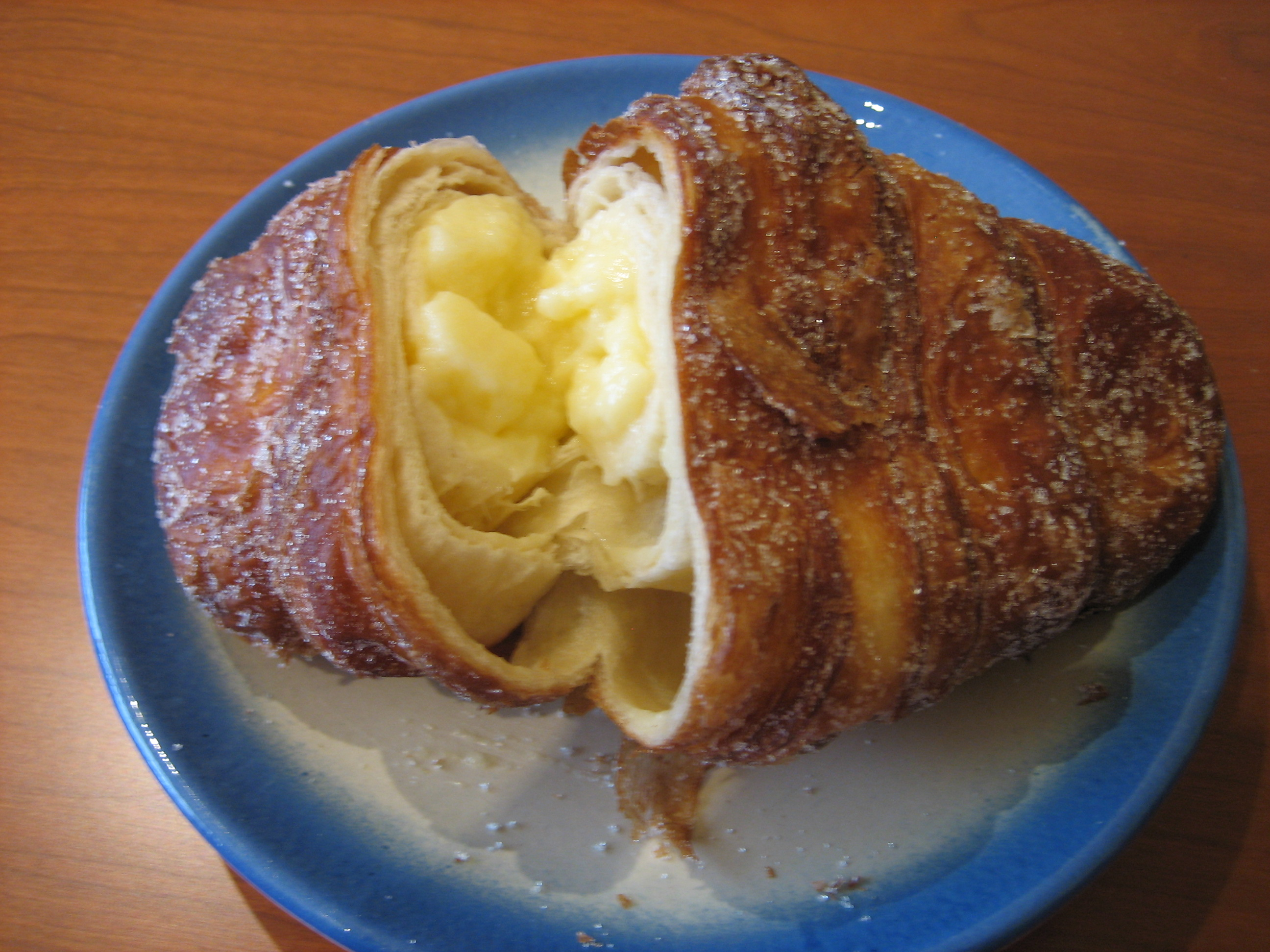
A xuixo

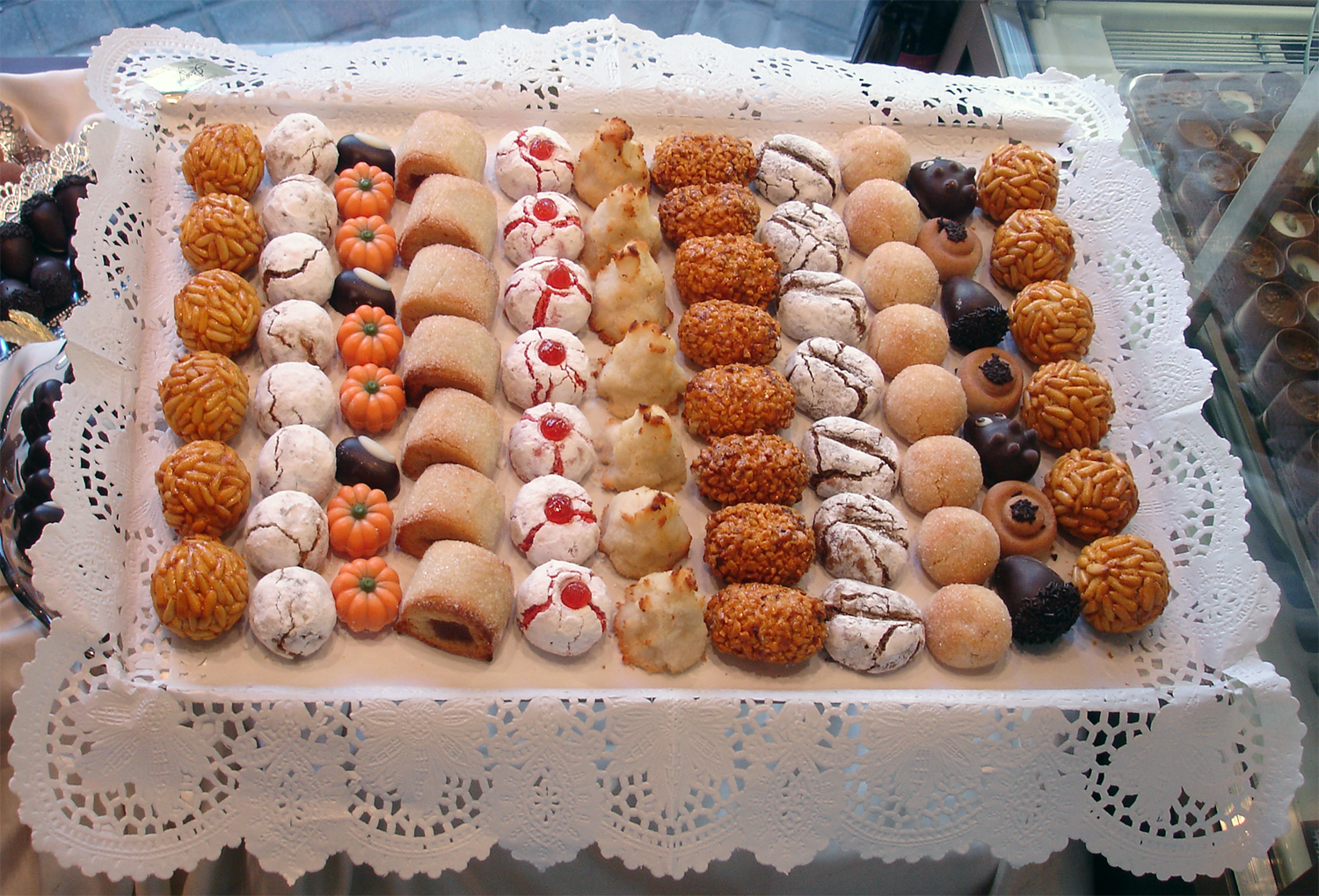
A tray of panellets, as they are typically served

- Crema catalana, the famous yellow cream made with egg yolk, milk and sugar, whose denseness is between a crème pâtissière or natillas and a flan; used to stuff a great amount of pastries, or to make simple desserts with, for example, fruit, and that is also eaten in a small flat pottery plate, after covering the cream with white crystal sugar and burning it, in order to create a layer of solid sugar that has to be broken with a small spoon before reaching the cream.
- Mató de Pedralbes or mató de monja is another kind of Catalan cream, similar to crema catalana, originating in Barcelona.
- Menjablanc or menjar blanc, typical of Reus but eaten all over Catalonia, is a kind of white cream made with almonds, from which a sort of milk is first obtained, followed by a cream to be eaten with a small spoon.
- Peres de Lleida is a typical dessert originated in Lleida composed of peeled pears cooked in a kind of lighter crema catalana and served cold, covered by meringue and decorated with cherries.
- Xuixos are fried pastries created in Girona and stuffed with crema catalana.
- Mel i mató, a dessert of mató cheese with honey.
- Pastissets, or casquetes, de cabell d'àngel are sweet half-circle shaped pastries stuffed with cabell d'àngel (a sort of marrow jam) and covered with white crystal sugar which are eaten at coffee time.
- Carquinyolis are little crunchy almond biscuits often eaten at coffee time.
- Catànies are Catalan marcona almonds covered with white chocolate and powdered black chocolate to be eaten with coffee.
- pets de monja are small nipple-shaped and -sized biscuits also eaten at coffee time. At first they were called pits de monja (nuns' nipples) but time has changed their name to the current pets de monja (nuns' farts).
- Sweet coques were at first eaten only on holidays. Catalans have at least one type of traditional coca for each holiday and feast day of the year.
- Orelletes are thin fried pastries covered with sugar and eaten during Carnival. They also exist in nearby regions in Spain or France.
- Sweet bunyols as bunyols de vent, bunyols stuffed with crema catalana or bunyols de l'Empordà are typically done and eaten on Wednesdays and Fridays during Lent.
- Mona de Pasqua is a pastry richly covered with almonds, yolk jam, chocolate eggs (or, currently, large chocolate sculptures) and coloured decoration that the godfather and godmother give as a present every year to their godchildren on Easter (Pasqua). It is an ancient pre-Christian tradition which marked the passage from childhood to the adult world. At first, it has one egg for each year of the children's age, and continuing to add one egg each year until twelve, as at thirteen they are no longer considered children.
- Panellets are small pastries made of pine nuts, almonds and sugar with different shapes and flavors, eaten during la Castanyada, which Catalans celebrate on 1 November instead of Halloween. Their origin is Jewish, before the Middle Ages, but the tradition of castanyada is much older.
- Tortell, also called torta or roscó in Northern and Southern dialects. It is round, it can be made of puff pastry or a mixture similar to lionesas and palos, and stuffed with trufa (a mixture of cacao, chocolate and cream) or with crema catalana. It is typically bought and eaten after Sunday's lunch, in family or with friends. A common alternative is called the braç de gitano (Gypsy's arm), that in Catalonia is always covered with yolk jam.
- A specific tortell is in fact a special coca that Catalans only eat on the Day of the Three Kings (6 January) which is called tortell de reis (or galeta de reis in Northern Catalonia) a typical ring-shaped pastry stuffed with marzipan or Catalan cream (crema catalana) and topped with glazed fruit and nuts.
- Torró, a Christmas sweet made with almonds with DAO of Agramunt (Lleida).
- Neules are also eaten on Christmas in Catalonia. They are dipped in cava (Catalan champagne). They have the same origin as waffles and Belgian Goffres.

== Wines ==
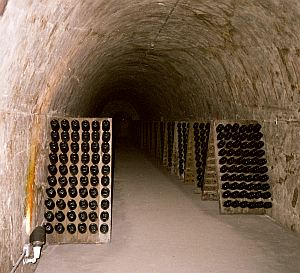
Cava wine aging

There are 11 Catalan wine-growing regions qualified by the INCAVI (The Catalan Institute of Wine): Priorat, Penedès, Catalunya, Costers del Segre, Conca de Barberà, Montsant, Alella, Tarragona, Empordà, Pla del Bages and Terra Alta.

The sparkling wine cava, made mainly in the Penedès and Anoia regions, is the Catalan equivalent to champagne. It is widely exported.

"Moscatell" (Empordà), is a sweet wine which have similar varieties in other countries such as France, Italy, Portugal, Albania, Slovenia, Greece, Romania and Turkey, as well as other regions of Spain. However, Catalan moscatell is thicker than French muscat and is not drunk before the meal (aperitiu) but after it, either with or after dessert.

== Alternative views ==
Some Catalan authors, such as Josep Pla, Jaume Fàbrega or Eliana Thibaut i Comalada, and others like Colman Andrews, have suggested that, besides Catalonia proper, this cuisine takes in the Balearic and Valencian cuisines, but this opinion is challenged as politicised, and is not widespread, nor is it supported by either the Balearic or the Valencian government, while the Catalan government itself provides divergent points of view. In any case, mutual ties do exist between Catalan gastronomy and other western Mediterranean gastronomies, such as Balearic cuisine, Valencian cuisine, Southern French cuisine, Aragonese cuisine or Murcian cuisine.

== Chefs and restaurants ==
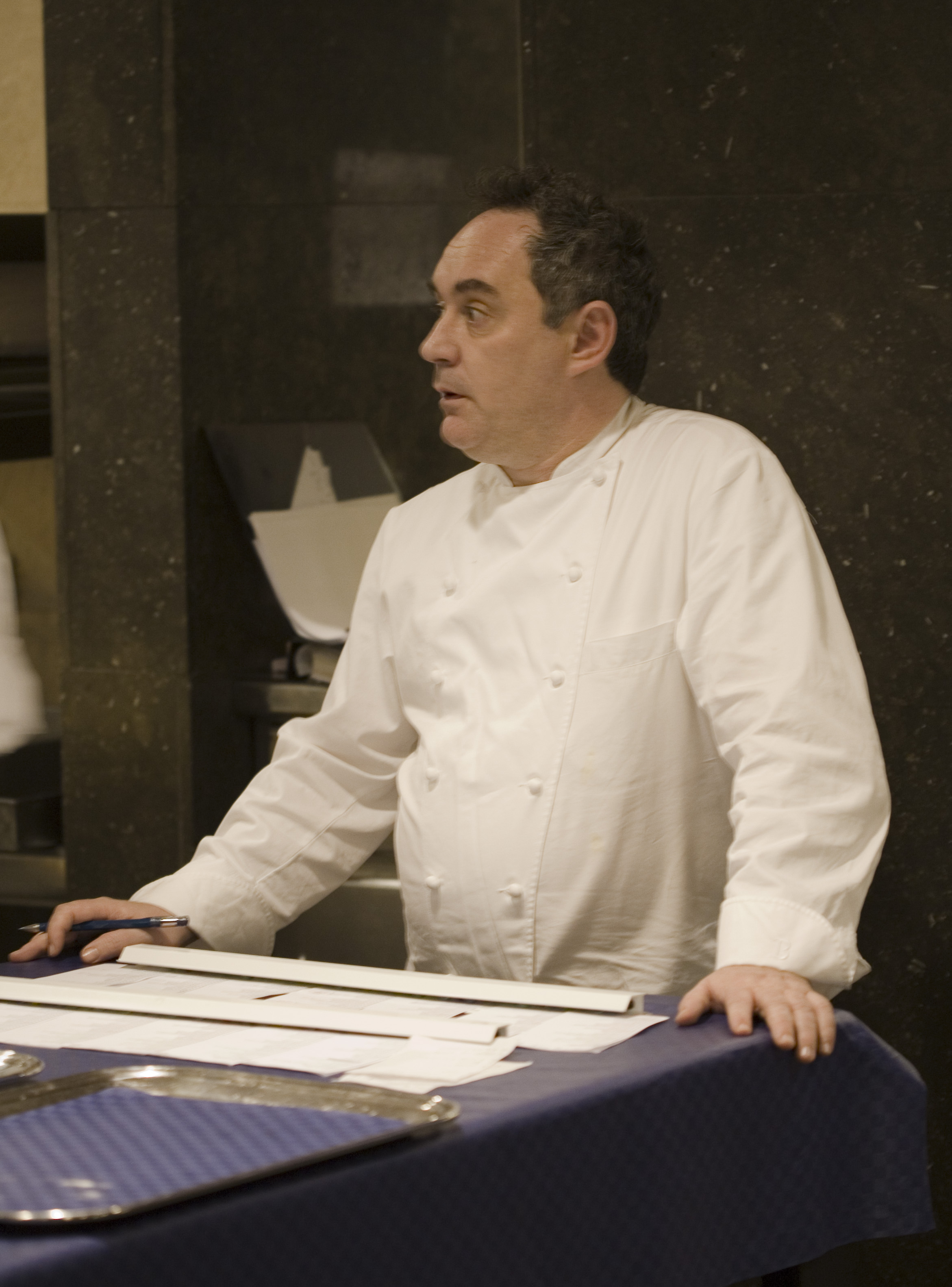
Ferran Adrià was the head chef of El Bulli

Catalan cooks and chefs are widely renowned and critically acclaimed all over the world. Three of The World's 50 Best Restaurants are in Catalonia, and four restaurants have three Michelin stars. The Michelin Guide Spain and Portugal 2022 edition awarded 49 restaurants across Catalonia with a total of 64 Michelin stars. Barcelona has 28 Michelin stars across 18 restaurants including Cinc Sentits and has been chosen as the best gastronomical city by the American TV network MSNBC in 2009, topping the list of the ten best gastronomical cities in the world. In Province of Girona are two of the best restaurants of the world, El Celler de Can Roca, the best of the world in 2014 and 2015, and elBulli, in Roses, the best one in 2002, 2006, 2007, 2008, 2009 and 2nd in 2010, before its closure in 2011.

== See also ==
- List of restaurants in Barcelona
- Spanish cuisine
