= Llibre del Coch =

Catalan recipe book written around 1490 by Master Robert de Nola

Libre del Coch (1520)

The Libre del Coch, or Libre de doctrina per a ben servir, de tallar y del art de coch cs (ço es) de qualsevol manera, potatges y salses compost per lo diligent mestre Robert coch del Serenissimo senyor Don Ferrando Rey de Napols, is a Catalan recipe book written around 1490 by Master Robert de Nola. Its earliest preserved printed edition is from 1520, published in Catalan in Barcelona. It includes mainly recipes from the Catalan cuisine of the time, some of them inherited from the Libre de Sent Soví, and some from neighboring countries, such as the Occitan cuisine and the Italian cuisine, including traditions from different areas dominated by the Crown of Aragon, which at that time was spread to the northeastern Mediterranean, Southern Italy, Corsica and Sicily. Despite not including Castilian recipes, was also very successful in Castile, was translated into Spanish in 1525 and republished in this language several times. It is considered of great value for acquiring a good knowledge about the gastronomy of the Renaissance.

This book should not be confused with another lesser known work, which also deals about Catalan cuisine and is called Libre del Coch o del Ventre de la Canonja de Tarragona, written in 1331 by Guillem Clergue, butler of Guerau de Rocabertí .

== First editions ==
Libre del Coch was the first printed cookbook published in Catalan, or in Castilian Spanish; it was printed using a Gutenberg press. A copy printed on November 15, 1520, preserved in the Biblioteca Nacional de Catalunya in Barcelona, is the oldest known copy extant. In the time of King Charles I its translation into Castilian Spanish was requested, and it was first published in this language in 1529 (or 1525 ) in Toledo . The same year, much of the text was plagiarised by Diego Granado in his book Arte de Cocina. Throughout the century at least another five editions were printed in Catalan and seven in Spanish.

There are clues suggesting that the printed book of 1520 is a copy of an older text: it is dedicated to King Ferdinand I of Naples, who was king of Naples between 1458 and 1494, and also, and above all, maintains pre-1491 Lenten restrictions, excluding foods forbidden by the Church during Lent until 1491 from Lenten recipes, although from 1491 consumption of dairy products and eggs was no longer prohibited during Lent. In addition, the original ms. does not mention any products from the New World, which would have been known after Europe's contact with America in 1492.

== Content ==
The book consists of more than two hundred chapters, and most of them (two hundred and thirty-six) correspond to recipes but, as its full title indicates, begins with chapters devoted to how to cut meat and they are followed by others teaching how to serve different people at the table, such as sharpening, serving water, acting as a butler, waiter, room teacher, cloakroom attendant, and so on. The last chapter, under the title "Table" contains an index.

In this book there is no recipe with mushrooms, so present and prized in today's Catalan cuisine. For some authors, this fact, could be explained as a prevention against possible poisonings. On the other hand, and as a novelty with respect to the Libre de Sent Soví, there are already two recipes for rice, rice with meat broth and rice in a casserole in the oven, which could be the predecessors of rice in the casserole and the current rice and crust, representing the first rice dishes, as we now understand the rice dishes and paellas, described in writing about Catalan cuisine. There are eight recipes intended specifically for the sick. One of the Arabic recipes with an Arabic name, the alburnia, could be an ancient fig bread today, but with rose water, an ingredient, also of oriental influence, very common in this recipe and in the medieval cuisine of the Sent Soví. It includes two recipes explicitly titled "a la morisca" and others with a name that also specifies a foreign way of cooking, such as, for example: bona salsa francesa, torta a la genouesa xinxanelles a la veneciana or sopes a la lombarda, Only three recipes are specifying "a la catalana" (the Catalan way), perhaps due to a lack of awareness that the other recipes are also Catalan or because these recipes were known elsewhere with this qualifier. No recipe from Sent Soví has this label, although they are all Catalan.

In general, Catalan cuisine before the introduction of American foodstuffs was not very different from Ancient Roman cuisine. The ingredients used were limited, the mixes as well, prioritising the most esteemed and omitting some foodstuffs and mixtures that today would seem to us "a bit awkward"; instead the amount of species was increased. Cooking and table service were included, showing the basics of serving at table, as shown in other books of the same period, for example the handwritten Com tayllaràs devant un senyor.

== Author ==
We know, because it is written under the title of the printed book, that the author was called "mestre (master) Robert" and that he was the cook of "King Ferdinand of Naples", but do not know whether he was born in Nola (now part of Naples) or elsewhere, "anybody knows who was this character", "native of Catalonia".

The chapter “De offici de mestre de Estable” (which describes some obligations of the charge: "Stablemaster"), says very clearly:“E de aquesta materia nom curaré més de parlar-ne ara perquè en lo Llibre de Menescalia ja molt largament n'he parlat:...”(“.. about this matter I will be careful not to speak now because in the Libre de Menescalia I have already spoken of it very lengthily...”), therefore it is obvious to suppose that the author of the Libre del Coch and the author of the Llibre of Menescalia are the same person: mossen Manuel Dieç, butler of King Alfons the Magnanimous; at a later date, Master Robert de Nola (if he ever existed, for the name could be invented) would have copied the lost original manuscript written by Manuel Dieç. (See folio VIIIr or in Wikitexts: Page: Libre del Coch (1520) .djvu / 9 )

== Comparison with the Llivre de Sent Soví ==
The libre de Sent Soví is a famous 14th-century Catalan recipe book, handwritten rather than printed, with extant copies from that century. The author is unknown, since—unlike the author of the Libre del Coch—the author did not sign the book. The differences in the type of cooking are not important. It seems certain that Robert of Nola was familiar with the Libre de Sent Soví as he uses some elements and recipes from it. As an innovation, for example, Master Robert proposes sheep's milk in addition to the goat's milk in any recipe. Regarding spices, in general the Libre de Sent Soví uses less than the Book of the Coch. The Libre de Sent Soví contains only Catalan recipes whereas the Libre del Coch includes recipes of neighbouring cultures such as Italy, France and the Arab countries, but neither book contains any Castilian recipe. Despite this, the Libre del Coch was soon translated into Castilian Spanish. In 1491 the Church decided that Catholics could eat eggs and milk for Lent, but Robert of Nola was not aware of this, so these ingredients are absent from the Lenten recipes in both books. The style of the Libre del Coch is more literary. The Libre de Sent Soví was not widely known until the 20th century, whereas the Libre del Coch was, in the words of Josep Pla, "a true bestseller", being translated very quickly into several languages and considered "the book of Renaissance cookery".

== Bibliography ==
- Catalan medieval cuisine, Eliana Thibaut i Comalada, Cossetània Edicions, 2006 . ISBN 84-9791-216-0 (Catalan)
