= Fuet =

Catalan dry-cured pork sausage

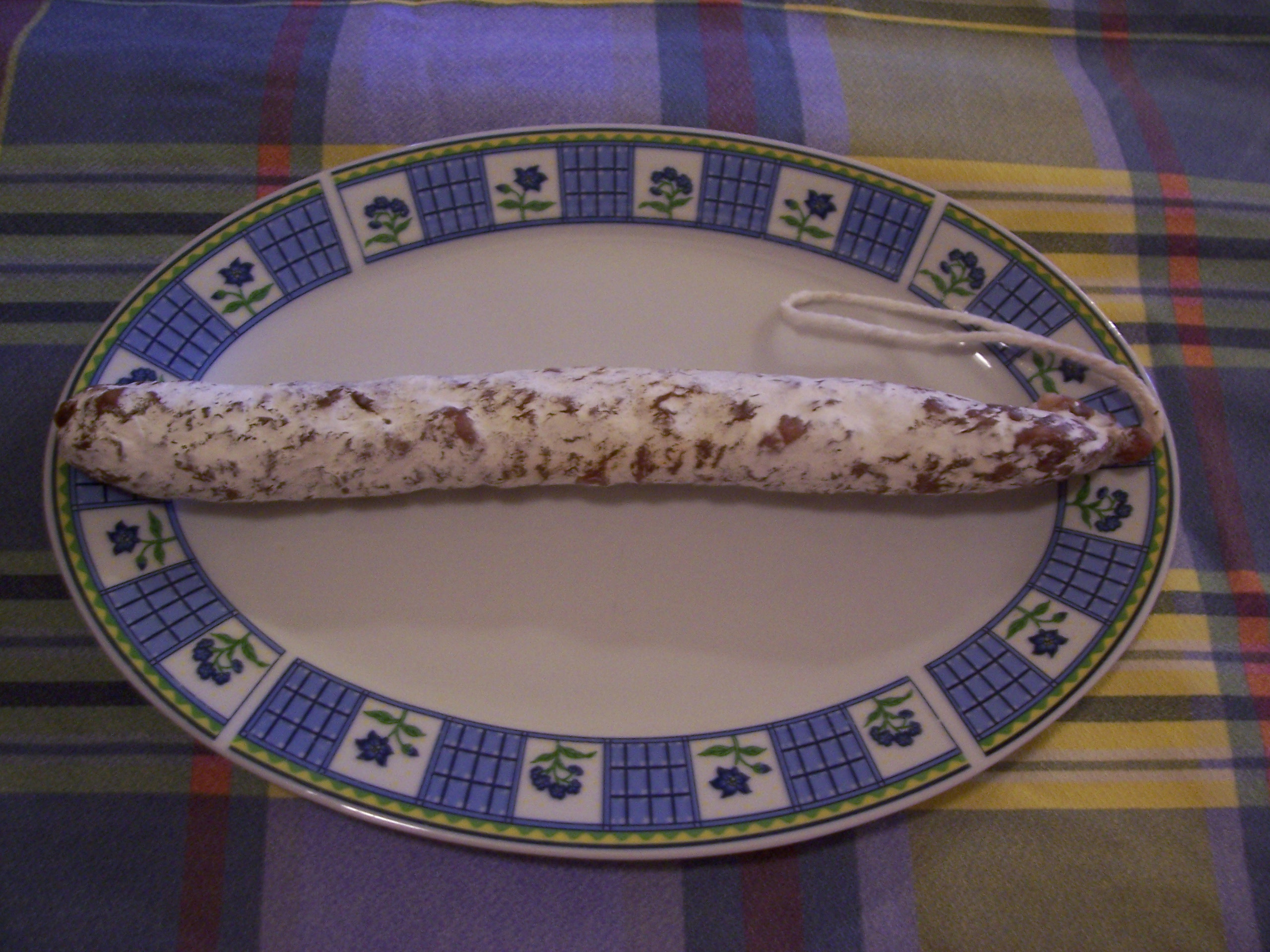
- Course: Sausage
- Place of origin: Spain
- Region or state: Catalonia
- Main ingredients: Pork

Fuet (Catalan pronunciation: [fuˈɛt], lit. "whip") is a Catalan thin, dry-cured, sausage of pork meat in a pork gut, covered with white, edible mould—similar to salami. The most famous is made in the comarca (county) of Osona and is also known as Vic fuet (fuet de Vic, after the city of Vic, capital of Osona). Other places that have long tradition of making it are the city of Olot and the surrounding areas.

Fuet is a long, thin shape measuring between 30 and 50 cm long and up to 4 cm in diameter, with a usual weight between 150 and 300 g. It is made of about 60% lean meat to 40% finely minced fat and is dry-cured.

== Flavour ==
Fuet is flavored with black pepper and garlic, and sometimes aniseed, but unlike chorizo contains no paprika. The intense umami flavor it leaves behind makes it very popular among the Japanese.

== History ==
In Europe, natural fermented sausages have a long tradition originating in Mediterranean countries during Ancient times. The Celts were famous for their cured meat, including hams and sausages. In the Roman documentation there is evidence that the Iberians already made sausages with names still in use today. There are several Roman documents that praise the Cerdanya hams made by the Iberians as some of the best in the world. The importance of sausages in European culture led to the establishment of routes to obtain the ingredients to prepare sausages, such as the "Via Salaria" salt route in Italy.

== Gallery ==
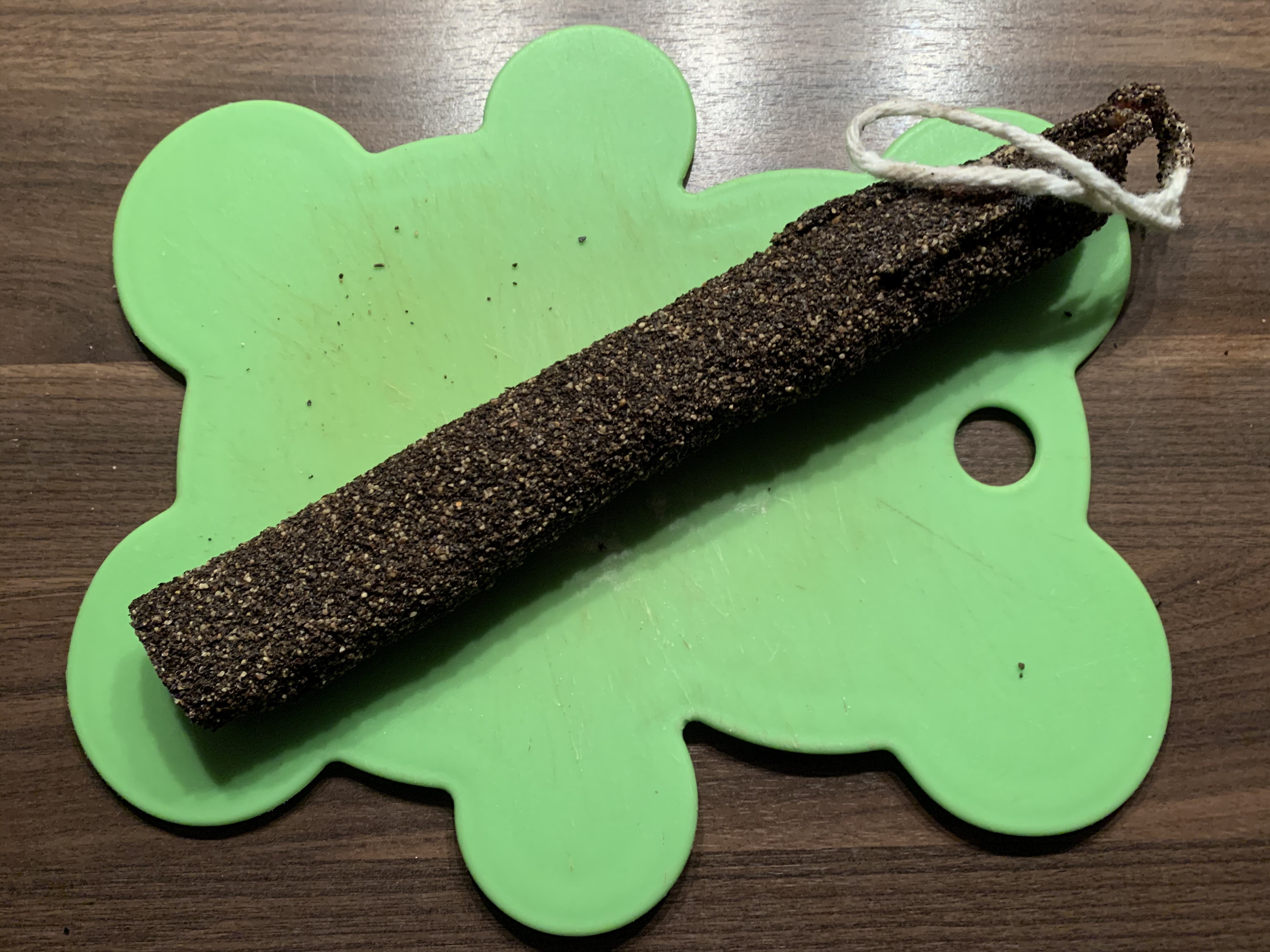
Fuet in pepper

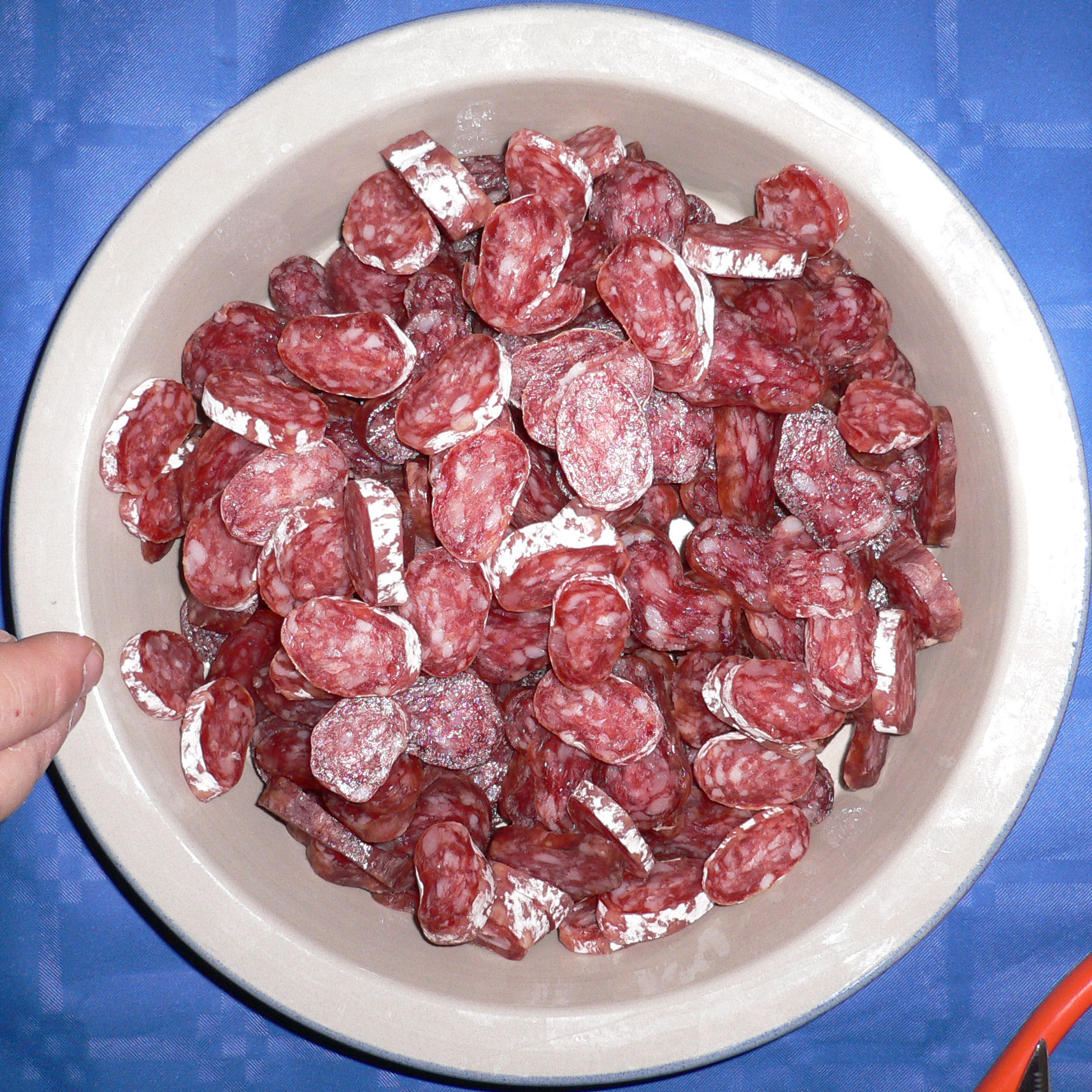
Slices of fuet

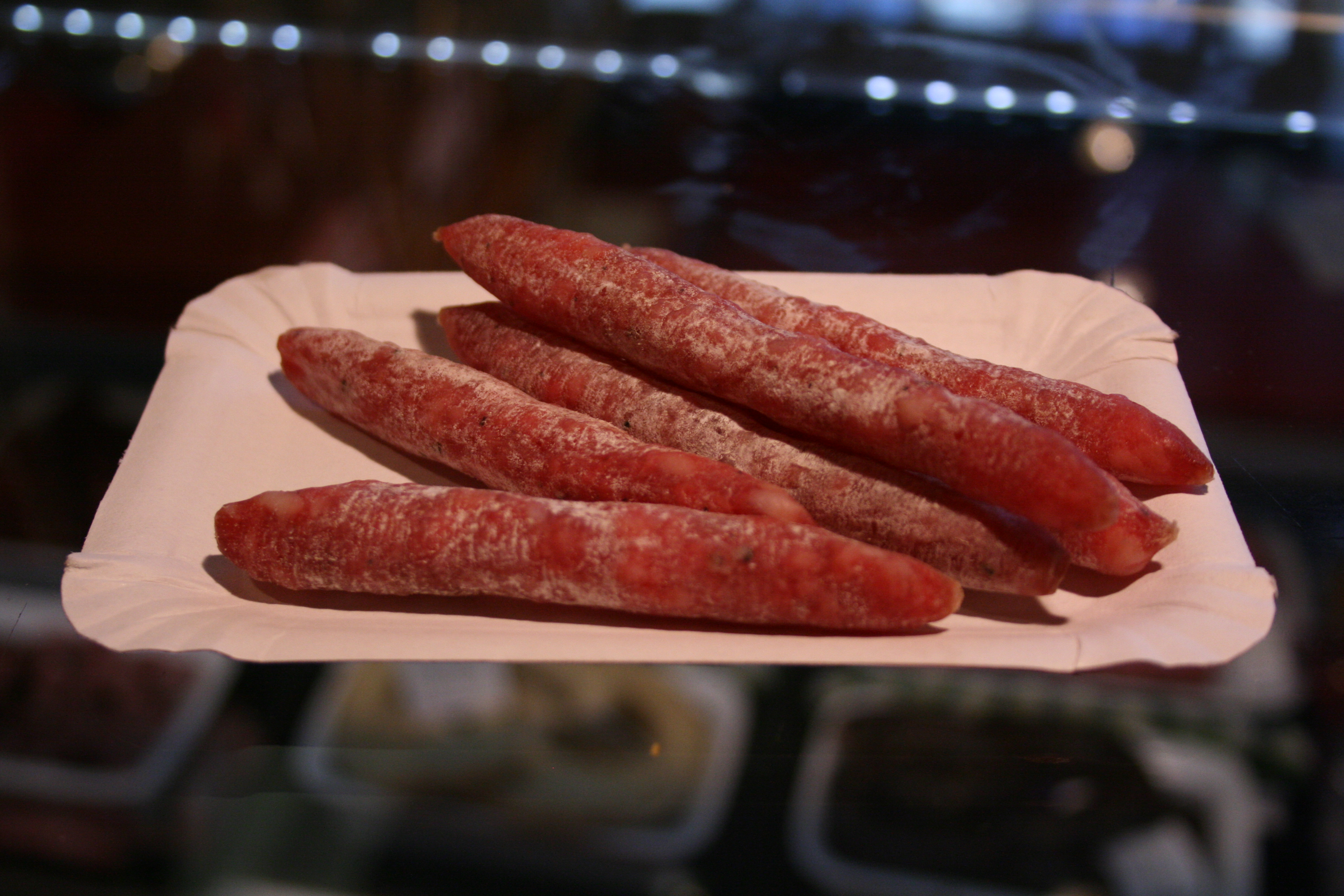
Fuet

== See also ==
- List of sausages
