= José Carreras Sings Catalan Songs =

José Carreras Sings Catalan Songs

José Carreras Sings Catalan Songs is a 1991 Sony Classical album featuring José Carreras and the orchestra of the Gran Teatre del Liceu conducted by Joan Casas. The songs are more classical lieder than Mi Otro Perfil, an earlier release of Spanish and Catalan songs with Orchestra Zafiro.

== Track listing ==
1. El Cant dels Ocells
2. Grieg T'estimo (originally German Ich liebe dich)
3. Cançó del lladre - Song of the Thief
4. El testament d'Amelia
5. Record de Solsona
6. Rosó from Pel teu amor
7. Cançó de taverna
8. Els contrabandistes
9. El noi de la mare
10. Frederic Mompou Damunt de tu, només les flors
11. Maig - May
12. Cançó de comiat - Song of Farewell
13. Festeig - Courtship
14. Cançó de bressol - Lullaby
15. Cançó de grumet - Cabin boy song
16. A l'ombra del lledoner - In the shade of the hackberry
17. Canticel
18. Cançó incerta
19. Cançó de passar cantant
