= Salsa de pago =

Sauce from medieval Catalan cuisine

Salsa de pago is a type of salsa found in medieval Catalan cuisine. The recipe for capons served with salsa de pago can be found in the 16th-century cookbook Libre de coch. This dish was served for Christmas dinner. According to the Libre de coch recipe it was made with ginger, cinnamon, cloves and saffron. The name salsa de pagó comes from peacock (Catalan: el paó) that the sauce is intended for, but it can be served with other types of poultry. It is similar to the recipe from the 14th-century Llibre de Sent Soví.
