= Caragols a la llauna =

Grilled or baked land snails from Catalonia, Spain

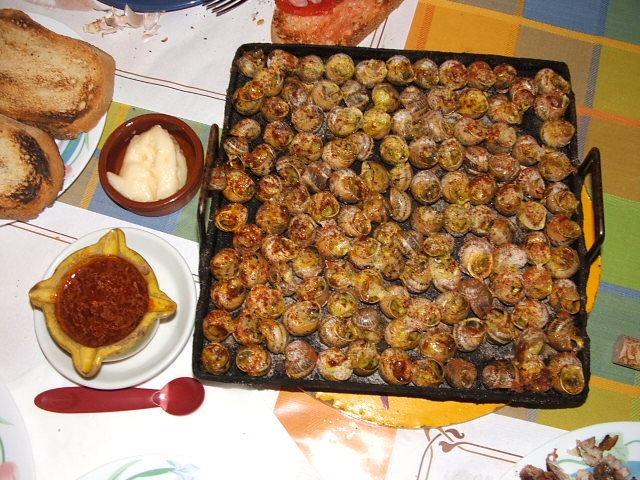
Caragols prepared in a metal pan

Caragols a la llauna (or cargols a la llauna in certain dialects, or cargolada in Northern Catalonia) is a delicacy of Catalan cuisine. It is a simple dish of land snails cooked on a grill, or in a llauna (tin pan) in an oven. The dish is particularly favored in Terres de Lleida, where it has been promoted since 1980 by L'Aplec del Caragol, and in the Pyrenees.

== Background ==
In the 1835 cookbook La cuynera catalana, there are two early recipes for snails with onion and rice. The recipes are meatless, as they were once considered suitable for consumption during Lent. The name petarrellada is sometimes used as a synonym for caragols a la llauna, although the term refers more specifically to the traditional method of roasting snails over a direct fire.

Caragols are popular at the annual L'Aplec del Caragol festival in Lleida, where in 2024 over 14 tons were consumed in three days. They are also eaten in the springtime at Fontcoberta and in the Balearic Islands.

== Preparation ==
Caragols are often prepared by not feeding them for a week so that they internally self-cleanse, repeatedly washing them, and then boiling them. Alternately, they can be left unboiled for what gourmands believe to be a better taste. They are subsequently cooked in a metal tin, either baked in an oven or cooked over a fire.

In Girona the local version involves chopped bacon being cooked inside the shell, while in Northern Catalonia they are cooked with melted lard.

They are often served with bread and dipping sauces like aioli or vinaigrette, and can be eaten by hand with a toothpick or fork to extract the meat from the shell. The most common snail used in preparation of caragols a la llauna is the garden snail, known locally as bover.
