= Catànies =

Spanish chocolate almond sweet

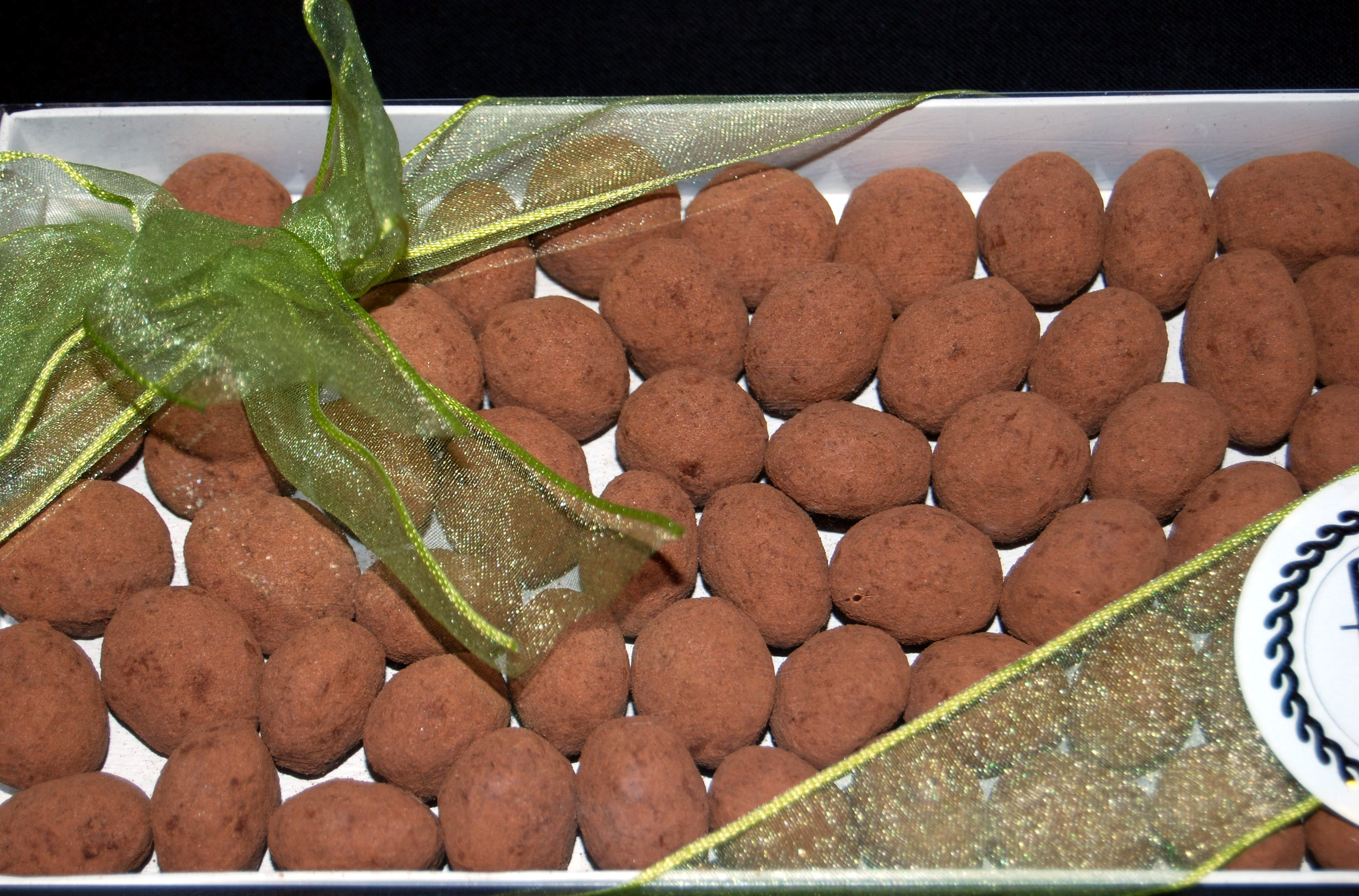
- Type: Confectionery
- Place of origin: Catalonia
- Region or state: Vilafranca del Penedès
- Main ingredients: Almonds, caramel, white chocolate or a mixture of almond, hazelnut and milk

Catànies (Catalan pronunciation: [kəˈtaniəs], singular: catània) is a chocolate sweet typical of Vilafranca del Penedès and some other near towns made with marcona almonds. They are toasted and covered first by caramel and then by a thick layer of white chocolate or a mixture of almond, hazelnut and milk. Finally, they are covered by a thin layer of powdered black chocolate, sometimes mixed with a little bit of icing sugar. They are often offered as a gift or served alongside coffee after a meal.

== See also ==
- Catalan cuisine
