= Mató =

Spanish cow or goat cheese

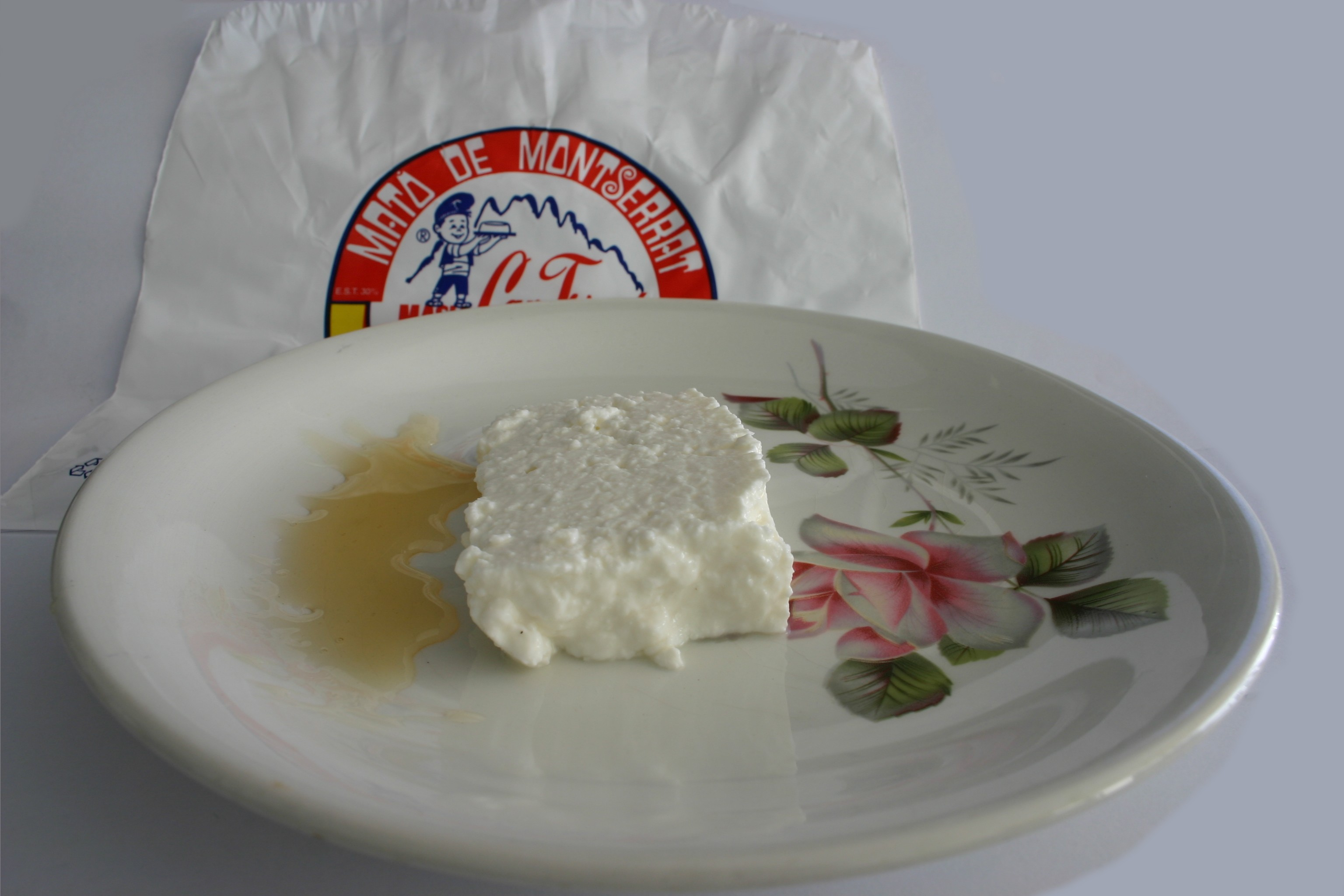
- Country of origin: Catalan Countries
- Region: Catalonia
- Source of milk: sheep, goats
- Texture: Soft

Mató (Catalan pronunciation: [məˈto]) is a fresh cheese of Catalonia made from sheep' or goats' milk, with no salt added.

It is usually served with honey, as a traditional and emblematic Catalan dessert known as mel i mató.

== Description and origin ==
Mató is a whey cheese similar to non-industrial variants of the fresh cheeses known as Brull in Maestrat, Ports de Beseit and the Southern Terres de l'Ebre and as Brossat in Andorra, Pallars, Menorca, Mallorca and parts of Occitania, as well as the brocciu in Corsica and other types of curd cheese such as Italian ricotta.

The Mató from the villages near the Montserrat mountain, such as Ullastrell and Marganell, is quite famous.

Mató is mentioned in the Sent Soví, a 14th-century Catalan cookbook, as well as in the El Noi de la Mare local Christmas carol. It was very popular during the Middle Ages, when it was made plain or scented with orange flowers.

It is made by hand by boiling the milk and coagulating it with a vegetable element such as the thistle flower (Cynara cardunculus), lemon juice or an animal element (rennet). The resulting product is filtered through a cloth in wicker or cane containers. A white, slightly sweet pasty mass is thus obtained due to the effect of the concentration of lactose in the milk.

Industrial manufacturing uses the same physical-chemical principle but pasteurized milk and large-capacity stainless steel tanks are used.

Mató is consumed as a dessert. It can be sprinkled with sugar, although the most traditional way is the one that uses honey to sweeten it. It is also used in some preparations such as cottage cheese cake (Greixonera de Brossat), as well as the preparation of a cake such as coca de brossat (coc de brossat).

== See also ==
- Catalan symbols
