= Robert de Nola =

- Other names: Mestre Robert
- Occupation: Chef
- Known for: Writing first Catalan cookbook

Robert de Nola, also known by pseudonym Mestre Robert, was a Spanish chef who authored the first printed cookbook in Catalan language, Llibre del Coch (Catalan for Cook's Book). He served as cook to King of Naples Ferdinand I.

== Llibre del Coch ==
Nola published Llibre del Coch under his pseudonym Mestre Robert in Barcelona in 1520. It was the first published cookbook in Catalan language. It was also translated into Castilian Spanish and first such edition was published in Toledo in 1525. Some parts of the book are based on Llibre de Sent Soví, a famous medieval cuisine cookbook. It contains recipes and culinary traditions of the 14th century.
