= El cant dels ocells =

Catalan traditional Christmas song and lullaby

"El cant dels ocells" (Catalan: [əl ˈkan dəlz uˈseʎs], 'The Song of the Birds') is a traditional Catalan Christmas song and lullaby. It tells of nature's joy at learning of the birth of Jesus Christ in a stable in Bethlehem. The song was made famous outside Catalonia by Pau Casals' instrumental version on the cello. After his exile in 1939, he began each of his concerts by playing this song. For this reason, it is often considered a symbol of Catalonia.

Joan Baez included it in her 1966 best selling Christmas LP Noël, with a dedication to Casals.

In 1991, Catalan tenor Josep Carreras recorded "El cant dels ocells" on his album José Carreras Sings Catalan Songs. His Three Tenors colleague Plácido Domingo also recorded the song on his 2014 album Encanto del Mar.

The most widely heard version of the song was performed by Andorran cellist Lluis Claret and soprano Victoria de los Angeles at the 1992 Summer Olympics closing ceremony just before the Olympic cauldron was extinguished.

== Lyrics ==
Catalan

El cant dels ocells

Cançó de nadal

Al veure despuntar
el major lluminar
en la nit més ditxosa,
els ocellets cantant,
a festejar-lo van
amb sa veu melindrosa.

L’àguila imperial
se’n vola cel adalt,
cantant amb melodia,
dient: Jesús és nat,
per treure’ns de pecat
i dar-nos alegria.

Repon-li lo pardal:
Avui, nit de Nadal,
és nit de gran contento!
El verdum i el lluer
diuen cantant, també :
"Oh, quina alegria sento!

Cantava el passerell :
Oh, que hermós i que bell
és l’infant de Maria!
I li respon el tord :
Vençuda n’és la mort,
ja naix la vida mia !

Refila el rossinyol :
És més bonic que el sol
més brillant que una estrella!
La cotxa i el bitxac
festegen al manyac
i a sa Mare donzella.

Cantava el reietó
per glòria del Senyor,
inflant amb biçarria;
el canari segueix:
llur música pareix
del Cel gran melodia.

Ja n’entra el cotoliu
dient: Ocells veniu
a festejar l’aurora!
I lo merlot, xiulant,
anava festejant
a la més gran Senyora.

L’estiverola diu:
No és hivern ni estiu
sinó que és primavera;
puix que és nada una flor
que pertot dóna olor
I omple la terra entera.

Cantava el francolí:
Ocells qui vol venir
avui a trenc de dia
a veure el gran Senyor
amb sa gran resplendor
a dins d’una establia?

Ve cantant el puput:
Eixa nit ha vingut
el Rei de més grandesa!
La tórtora i el colom
admiren a tothom
cantant sense tristesa.

Picots i borroners
volen entre els fruiters
cantant llurs alegries;
la guatlla i el cucut
de molt lluny han vingut
per contemplar el Messies.

Cantava la perdiu
Me’n vaig a fer lo niu
dins d’aquella establia,
per a veure l’Infant
com està tremolant
en braços de Maria.

La garsa, griva o gaig
diuen: Ara ve el maig!
Respon la cadernera:
Tot arbre reverdeix,
tota branca floreix
com si fos primavera.

Xiuxiueja el pinsà:
Glòria avui i demà;
sento gran alegria
de veure el diamant
tan hermós i brillant
als braços de Maria.

El xot i el mussol
al veure eixir el sol
confosos se retiren.
El gamarús i el duc
diuen: Mirar no puc;
tals resplendors m’admiren!

Literal English Translation

The Song of the Birds

Christmas Carol

In seeing emerge
The greatest light
During the most celebrated of nights,
The little birds sing.
They go to celebrate Him
With their delicate voices.

The imperial eagle
flies high in the sky,
singing melodically,
saying, "Jesus is born
To save us all from sin
And to give us joy."

The sparrow responds,
Today, this Christmas Eve,
Is a night of good cheer!"
The greenfinch and the siskin
Say in singing, too,
"Oh, what joy I feel!"

The linnet sang,
"Oh, how lovely and beautiful
Is the child of Mary!"
The thrush answers:
"Death is conquered,
My life now begins!"

The nightingale twitters,
"He is more beautiful than the sun,
More brilliant than a star!"
The redstart and the stonechat
Celebrate the infant
And his virgin Mother.

The wren sang
For the glory of the Lord,
Inflating with fantasy;
The canary follows:
Its music sounds like
A great song from Heaven.

Now comes the woodlark
Saying, "Come birds
To celebrate the dawn!"
And the big blackbird, whistling,
Went celebrating
The greatest Lady.

The tit says,
"It is neither winter nor summer
But rather springtime;
A flower is born
That gives a sweet smell all around
And fills the whole world."

The francolin sang,
"Birds, who wants to come
Today at daybreak
To see the good Lord
With all of his splendor
Within a stable?"

The hoopoe goes singing,
"This night has come
the greatest of Kings!"
The turtle dove and rock dove
Admire, and to all
Sing without sadness.

Woodpeckers and bullfinches
Fly between fruit trees
Singing their joys.
The quail and the cuckoo
From afar have come
To see the Messiah.

The partridge sang,
"I am going to make my nest
Inside of that stable,
To look upon the Infant;
How he trembles
In the arms of Mary."

The magpie, mistle thrush, and jay
Say, "May is coming!"
The goldfinch responds,
"All the trees become green again,
All the branches flower
As if it were the spring."

The chaffinch whispers,
"Glory today and tomorrow;
I feel great joy
To see the diamond
So handsome and brilliant
In the arms of Mary."

The scops owl and little owl
Seeing the sunrise
Leave confused.
The tawny owl and eagle-owl
Say, "I cannot look;
Such splendors are in front of me!"

== Recordings ==
- Short speech by Pau Casals at the United Nations in October 1971, followed by a separate recording of "El cant dels ocells" YouTube
- Joan Baez "The Carol of The Birds" YouTube
- José Carreras "El cant dels ocells" (Singing with piano accompaniment) YouTube
- Placido Domingo "El cant dels ocells" YouTube
