= Gazpachuelo =

Spanish soup

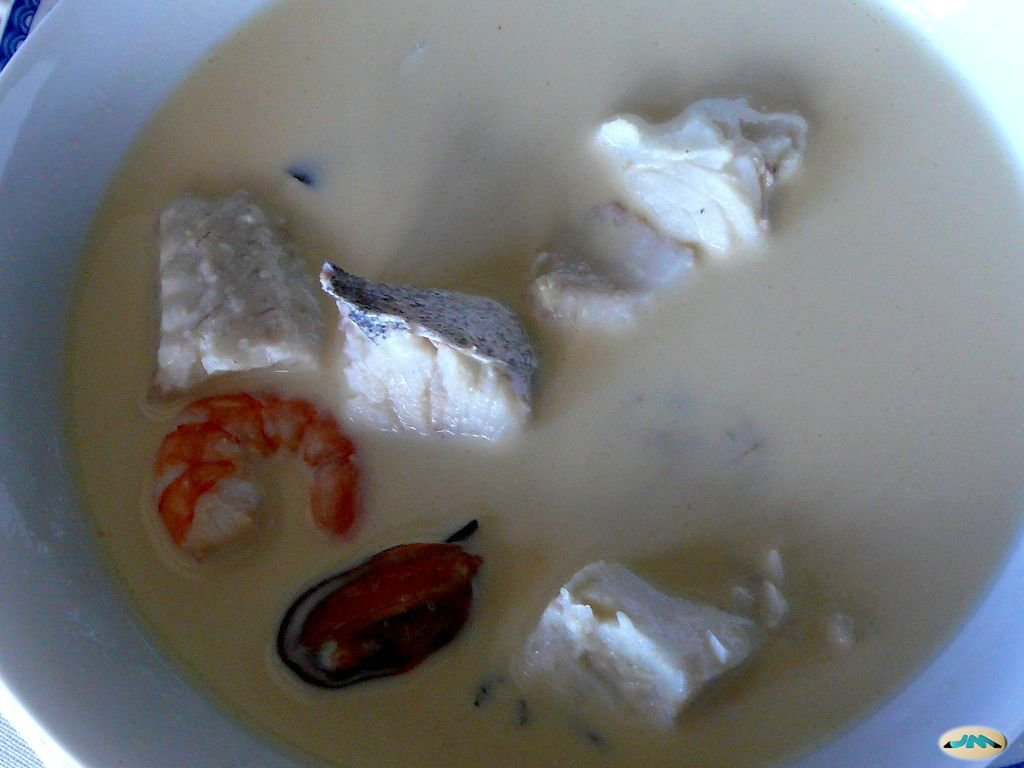
- Type: Soup
- Place of origin: Spain
- Region or state: Málaga
- Serving temperature: Hot
- Main ingredients: Fish stock; bread; garlic; oil; egg; water

Gazpachuelo is a soup originating in Málaga, Spain, and is a typical fisher's dish, consisting of mayonnaise, garlic, egg yolk, and olive oil. The egg white is added to thicken the mixture, along with cubed potatoes.

== Characteristics ==
Although it is consumed hot, gazpachuelo owes its name to the fact that it contains the four basic ingredients of gazpacho: bread, garlic, oil, and water. The bread is dipped into the soup. It is a typical dish of the lower classes because of the low cost of its basic ingredients. Variations of the soup include adding shellfish, peeled shrimp, or whitebait.
