= Ollada =

French stew from Roussillon

- Type: Casserole
- Place of origin: France
- Region or state: Roussillon
- Main ingredients: potatoes, beans, cabbage, turnips, pork

Ollada is a stew of potatoes, beans and cabbage or turnips, considered (along with boles de picolat and caracolada) the most typical and traditional dish of Northern Catalonia. The often-repeated saying "l'ollada, ben porquejada" ("the stew, well porked-out") indicates that the fundamental ingredient is pork with seasonable vegetables. In Vallespir they used to add barley. Like olla aranesa, it is eaten together, i.e. without the broth being drained off to make soup, as is usually done with escudella, and it is usually much thicker.

== See also ==
- Escudella
