= Escudella =

Traditional Catalan and Valencian soup

Escudella i carn d'olla
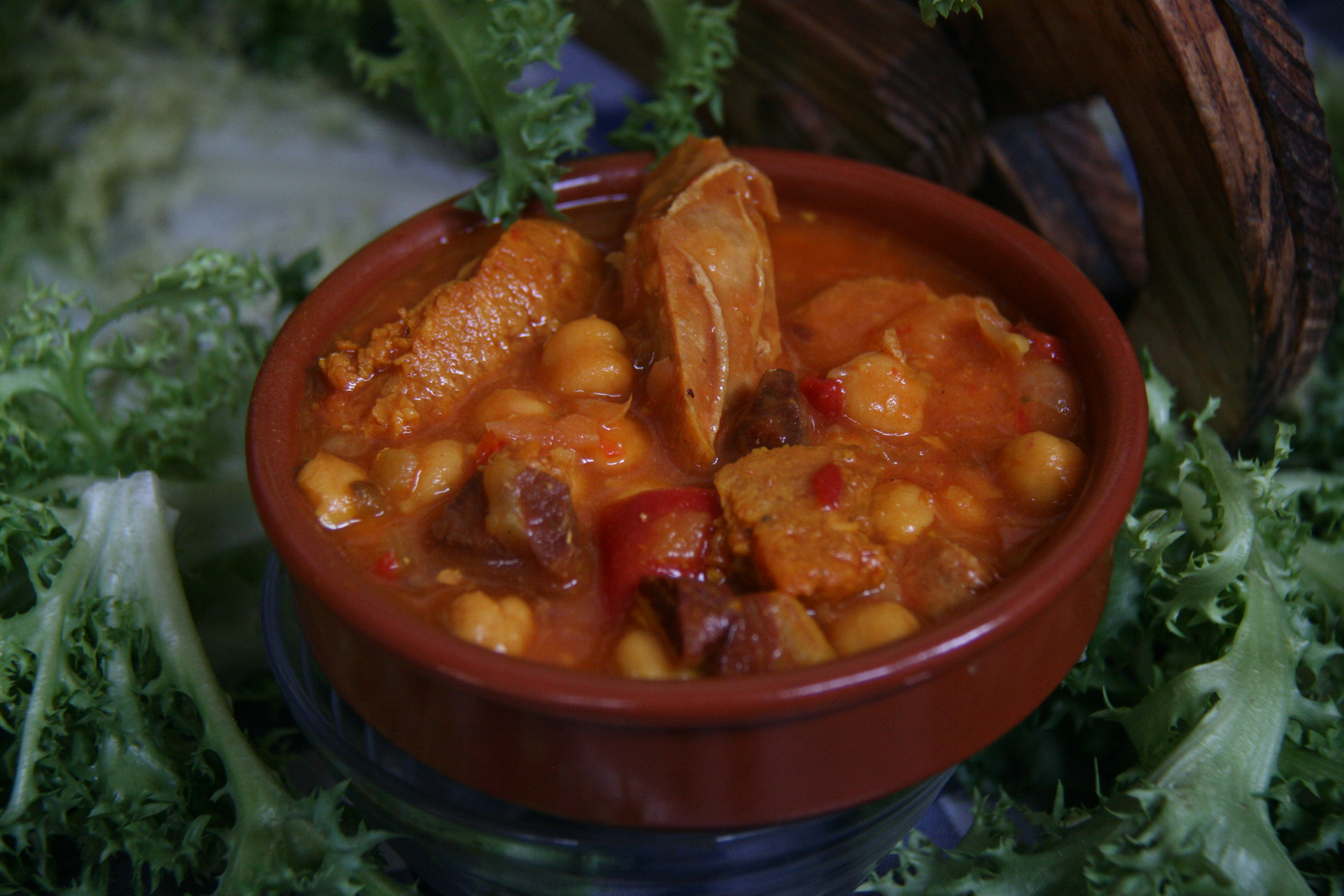
- Alternative names: Escudella
- Type: Soup
- Place of origin: Spain
- Region or state: Catalonia; Valencian Community
- Main ingredients: Pilota (large spiced meatball), vegetables
- Variations: Escudella de pagès

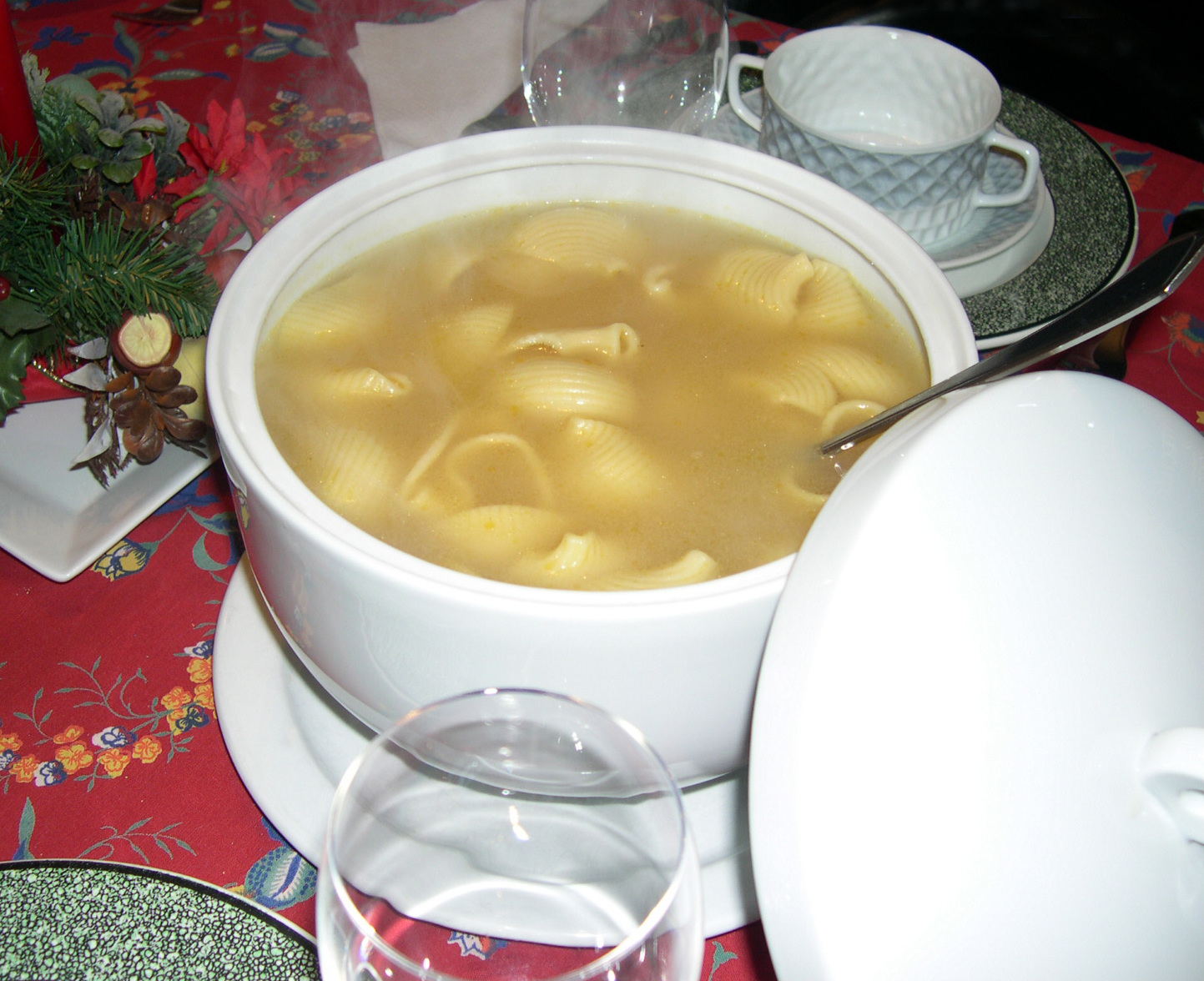
A bowl of escudella with pasta

Escudella i carn d'olla, or shorter escudella (Eastern Catalan: [əskuˈðeʎə]; lit. 'bowl'), is a traditional Catalan and Valencian soup made with meat and vegetables. Francesc Eiximenis wrote in the 14th century that it was eaten every day by Catalan people.

It is characterized by the use of a pilota, a very big meatball spiced with garlic and parsley; it also contains vegetables as celery, cabbage, carrots, etc. depending on the season. Additionally, bones, sausages called botifarra, and other types of meat, can be used.

== Service ==
Escudella is typically served in two parts:

- The escudella proper is a soup consisting of a broth with pasta, rice or both.
- The carn d'olla is all the meat used in the broth, served afterwards in a tray along with the vegetables used.

When both parts are served mixed together, it is called escudella barrejada or escudella de pagès.

== Escudella de Nadal ==
There is a particular version of this soup that can be called "escudella de Nadal" (Christmas soup) or either "sopa de galets" (galets' soup), and is very typical on Christmas Day. It includes meat from four different animals, a pilota, several vegetables and the traditional special type of pasta, known as galets, which are snail-shaped and notable for their considerable size.

== See also ==
- Catalan cuisine
- List of soups
