= Balearic cuisine =

Mediterranean cuisine as cooked in the Balearic Islands, Spain

Balearic cuisine is a Mediterranean cuisine as cooked in the Balearic Islands, Spain. It can be regarded as part of a wider Catalan cuisine, since it shares many dishes and ingredients with Catalonia and the Valencian Community. Others view it as part of a more global Spanish cuisine. Traditional Balearic cuisine is rich in vegetables, cereal and legumes as well as being low in fats. A succinct selection of the primary dishes would be ensaimades, seafood and vegetable stews, sobrassada, coques, tombet, Maó cheese, almonds, and wine.

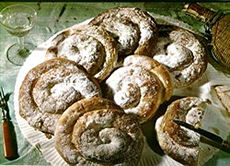
"Ensaïmades", a typical Majorcan pastry

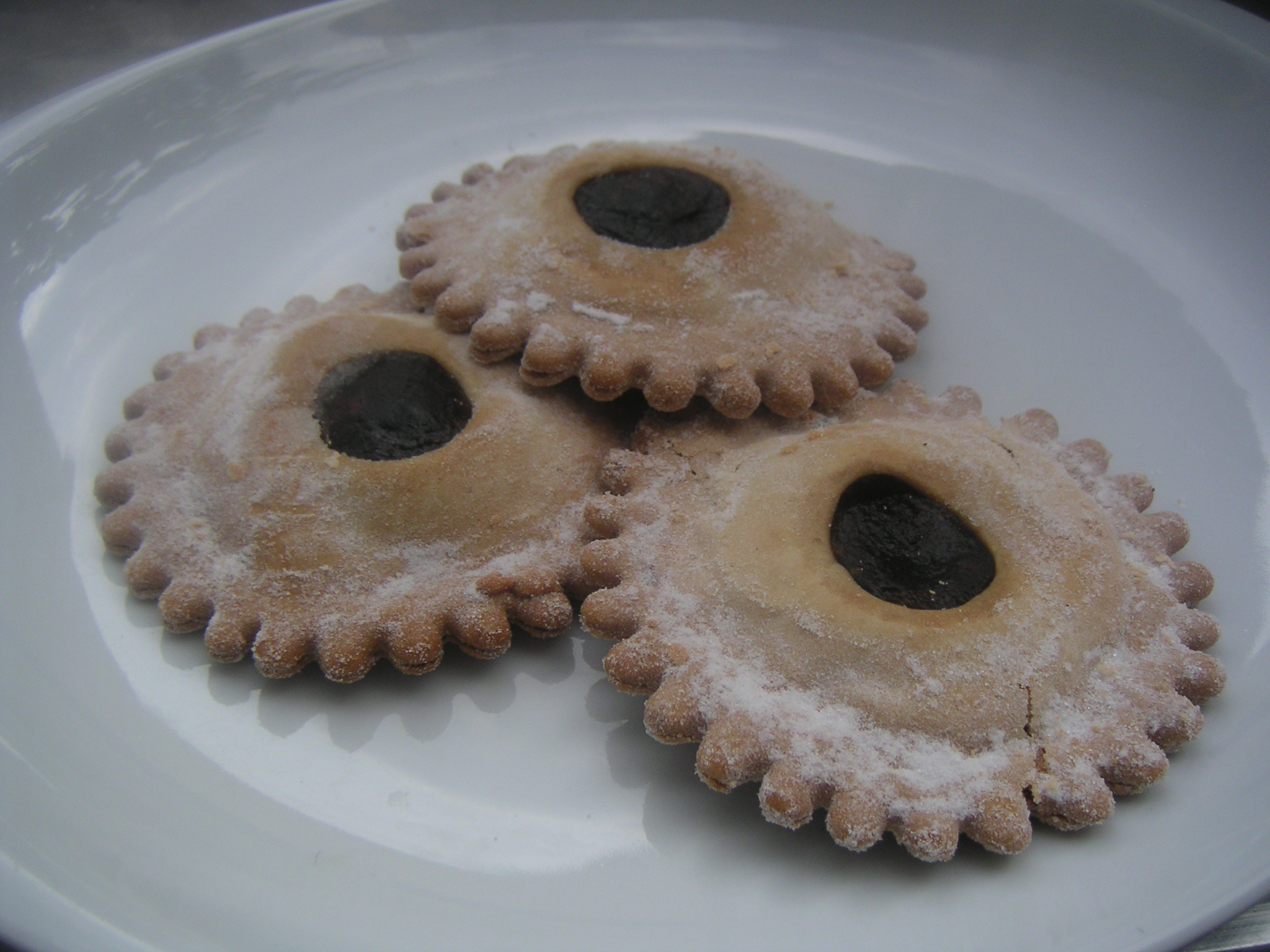
Crespells

== Bakery and confectionery ==
- Unsalted bread
- Ensaïmada: a lard-based pastry sprinkled with powdered sugar, "the Balearics' gastronomic pride and joy"
- Flaó: Cottage cheese tart. The recipe includes eggs, cottage cheese, sugar and mint. The mixture of savoury and sweet flavourings may reflect Arab influence from the Islamic past of the islands.
- Coca: Similar to Italian pizza but without cheese. Typically, Majorcan varieties include julivert (parsley), pebres torrats (roasted peppers), and trempó (tomato, green pepper and onion salad).
- Easter baking products
  - Panades: lamb and pea pasties.
  - Robiol: cottage cheese- or jam-stuffed pastry
- Crespell is a Majorcan kind of biscuit.

== Vegetables ==
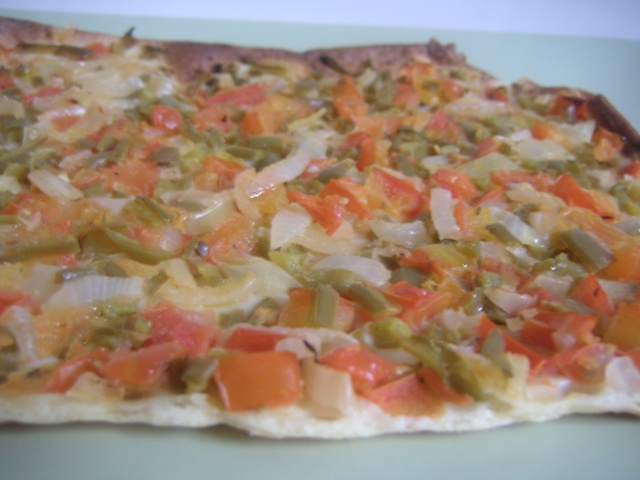
Coca de trempó, typical in summer in the Balearic Islands

Traditional vegetables dishes are:

- Tombet: Fried courgettes, potatoes, eggplant and red peppers baked in tomato sauce, related to similar Mediterranean dishes such as samfaina or ratatouille.
- Fava parada: Fava bean and mixed vegetable puree
- Trempó: made of pepper, onion and tomato; eat with mussels, in coques, as a salad, etc.
- Sopas mallorquinas: made of vegetables, broth, and bread slices.

== Meat ==
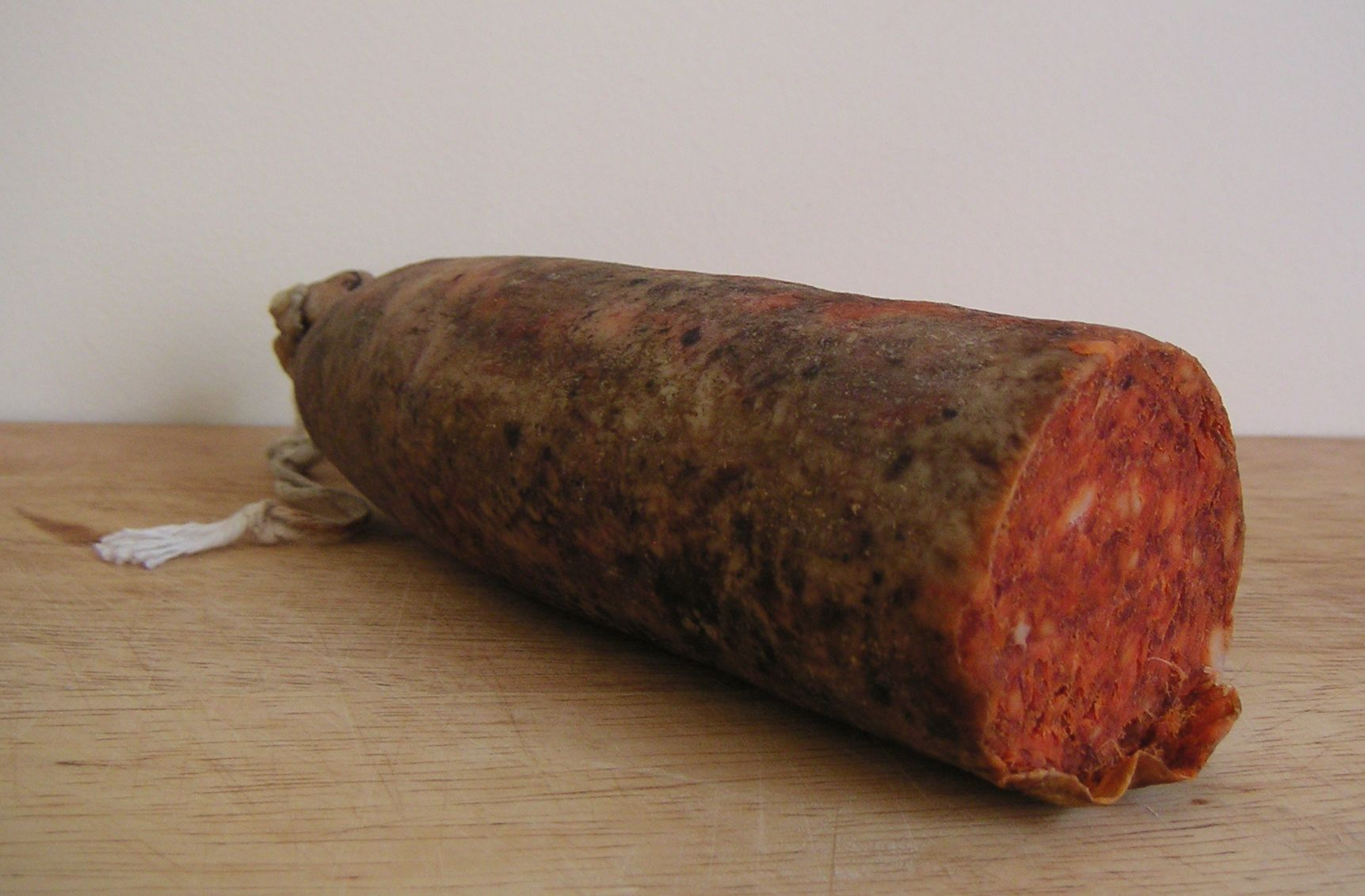
A sobrassada

- Sobrassada sausage
- Rostit humit, garrí rostit: lamb and piglet roasts
- Albergínies o carabassons farcits: Eggplants (aubergines) or zucchinis (courgettes) stuffed with minced meat
- Arroz brut: "Dirty rice"—meat, vegetables, rice and spices cooked in a meat broth.
- Arròs de la terra: bulgur with local specialities as botifarra, etc.
- Macarrons amb grevi: penne in a sauce similar to British gravy

== Fish ==
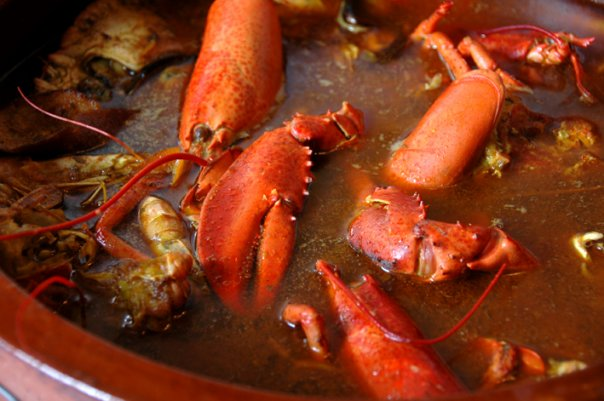
Caldereta

Because the Balearics are an island environment, fish and seafood are featured prominently in the local cuisine.

- Caldera de llagosta: Lobster stew
- Baked fish, such as anfós (grouper)
- Arròs de peix: rice cooked in a fish broth with fish pieces
- Frita de calamar: fried squid with potatoes

== Fats ==
- Olive oil is the most commonly used fat in Balearic cooking. Butter is used sparingly, even in dishes frequently relying upon butter in other parts of the world, e.g., ous ferrats (fried eggs)
- Mayonnaise is called all i oli, 'garlic and oil' in Catalan. Some historians argue that mayonnaise originates from Mahon (known in Catalan as Maó), the capital of the Balearic island of Menorca.

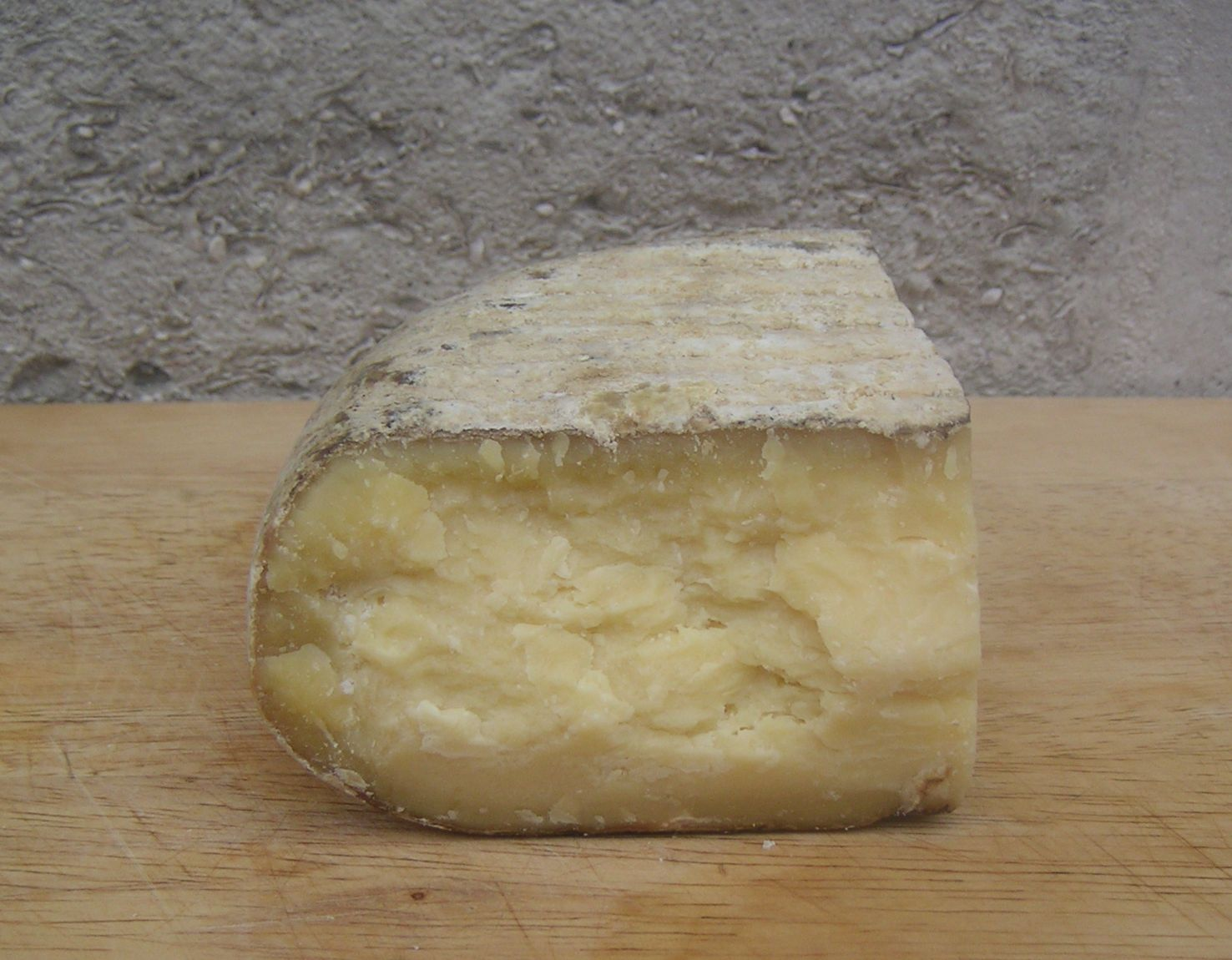
Mahón cheese

== Other ==
- Maó cheese: a hard cow's milk cheese similar to Grana Padano or Parmesan
- Red wines from the Binissalem and Pla i Llevant areas.
- Escargots: Snails are eaten in a stew, also containing meat, potatoes, and fennel. Snails are also eaten sometimes in paella.

== See also ==
- Catalan cuisine
- Valencian cuisine
- Spanish cuisine
