= Cuisine of Menorca =

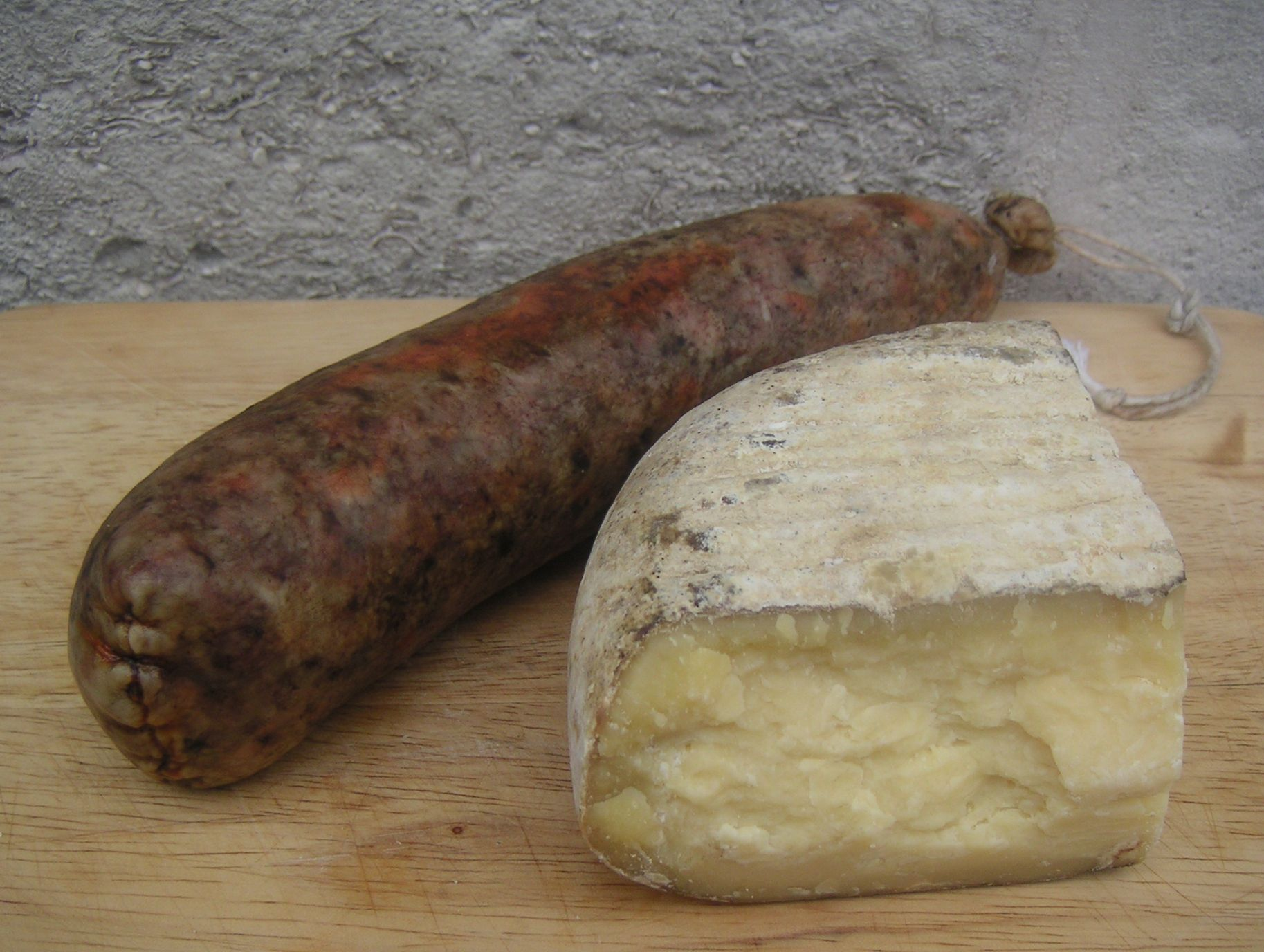
Menorcan Sobrassada and Mahón cheese

Menorcan cuisine refers to the typical food and drink of Menorca.

Menorca is a rocky island in the Balearic archipelago in Spain, consisting of eight municipalities. Featuring a Mediterranean climate, the weather is milder in the south while in the north there are strong winds all year round. Marine salt, carried by the wind to the pastures where cows graze, is what gives the cheese its typical flavour. Seafood is a major element of the island's cuisine, but additionally, there are horses, pigs (used for cold cuts) and cows (the skin of which is used to produce leather, and the milk to produce cheese). Agriculture is small-scale and varied, consisting of typical Mediterranean products. Within this typical Mediterranean cuisine there are also the influences of various invading people, particularly the English, who brought plum cake, puddings, and punch. The rural and marine cuisine is mostly based on greens and vegetables from one's own garden, locally produced meat, and fish and seafood caught in the same day. Olive oil, although not produced on the island, is also a fundamental ingredient in local dishes.

Menorcan cuisine is generally simple and seasonal. It is based on fishing, particularly longline fishing, and on seafood, especially crustaceans, clams and squid. Fruits and vegetables are cultivated in as much variety as possible, and on a small scale, only for local consumption.

Until the second half of the twentieth century, goats were in such abundance that they were only eaten when there was a famine, caused by spoiled crops or insufficient fishing. Today, they are a luxury. Rabbit is another common element of the cuisine. In the seventeenth century, the English unsuccessfully attempted to introduce deer and hares. Few are left nowadays, but rabbits and various fowl are still hunted or bred.

== General aspects ==
In Menorca, some of the first written mentions of its cuisine are found in 1891, in notes belonging to Archduke Ludwig Salvator of Austria, who references some typical cooking but without any recipes. In 1923, Pedro Ballester published De re cibaria which collected a substantial part of popular wisdom and offered detailed anonymous recipes

Mediterranean crops had a strong influence, encouraging the use of olive oil, wine, legumes and foods pickled in salt. The substratum of Arab culture is also important, as well as additions from French and English cuisine, owing to their respective periods of control over the island in the eighteenth century.

Even today, when most products can be obtained all year round, Menorca has a seasonal cuisine, which varies ingredients and recipes according to the cycles of the seasons and recognized holidays.

== Basic ingredients ==
- Fish: pearly razorfish, sheepsheads, stingrays (wings and liver), scorpionfish, groupers, goosefish, rock fish in general, and salted cod.
- Seafood: mussels, cockles, squid, cuttlefish, octopus, shrimp, scampi, lobster, crab, sea snails.
- Vegetables: vine tomatoes, onion, garlic, chili pepper, aubergine, courgette.
- Legumes: dry white string beans (called guixons on the island).
- Greens: chard, spinach, peas (called fesols on the island), cabbage.
- Fruits: figs, peaches, apricots, pears, grapes, oranges, lemons.
- Nuts: dates, almonds, pine nuts.
- Meat: chicken, rabbit, pork, beef, cold cuts.
- Mushrooms: saffron milk cap, dried mushrooms.
- Other: olive oil, bread, honey, capers, wine, eggs, snails, ricotta, figat (similar to Spanish fig cake and meringue).

== Specialties ==
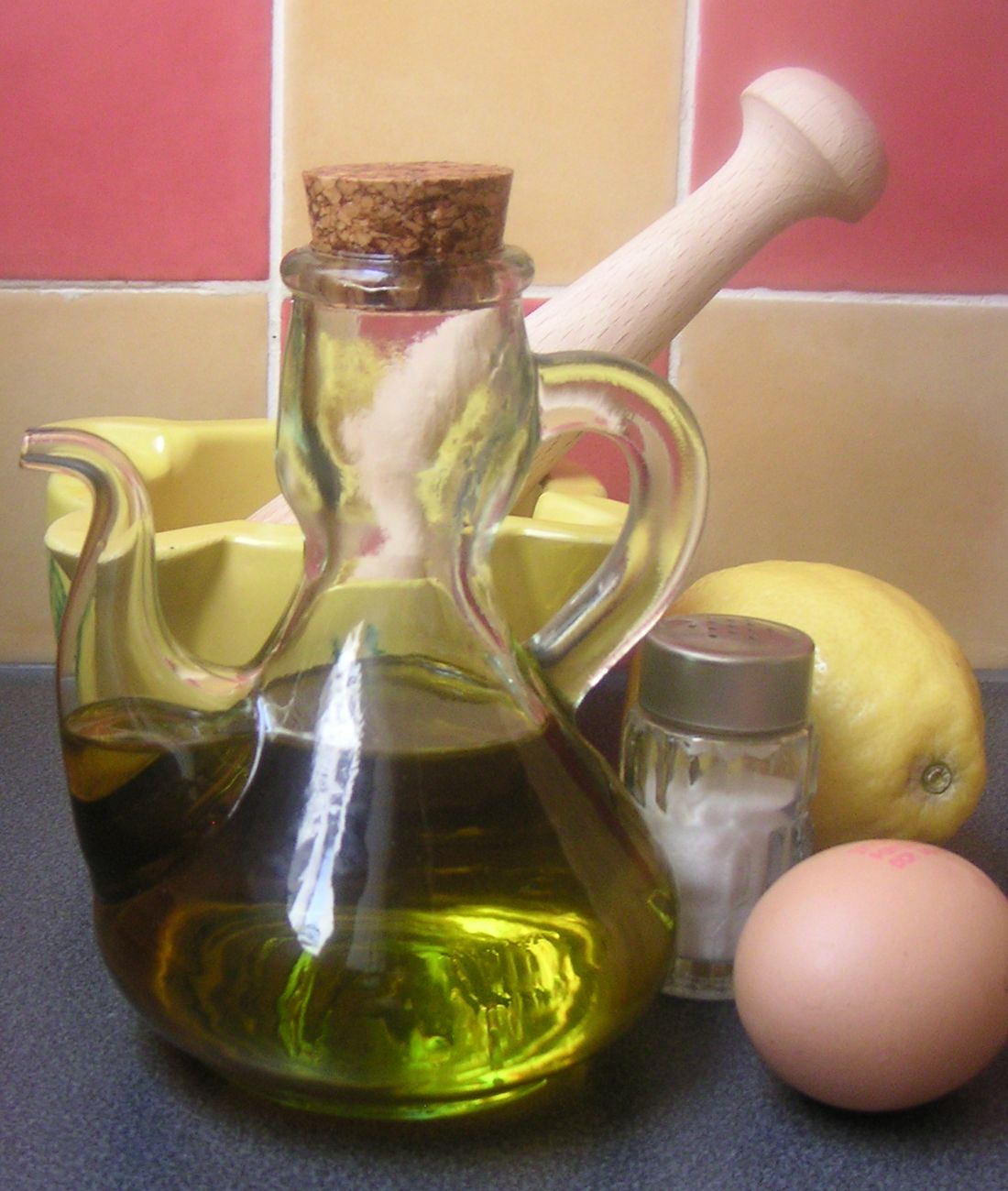
Basic ingredients of mayonnaise: eggs, olive oil and lemon juice

=== Mayonnaise ===
Mayonnaise supposedly originates in the Menorcan city of Mahón. According to this theory, this sauce — an emulsion of eggs and olive oil — was brought to France following a brief French occupation of the island. According to a different theory, it was invented in a French town called Maiona, or perhaps Baiona. In any case, mayonnaise, with or without garlic, is a product of frequent use in the traditional cuisine of the island since ancient times, on its own or as an ingredient in dishes.

=== Mahón cheese ===
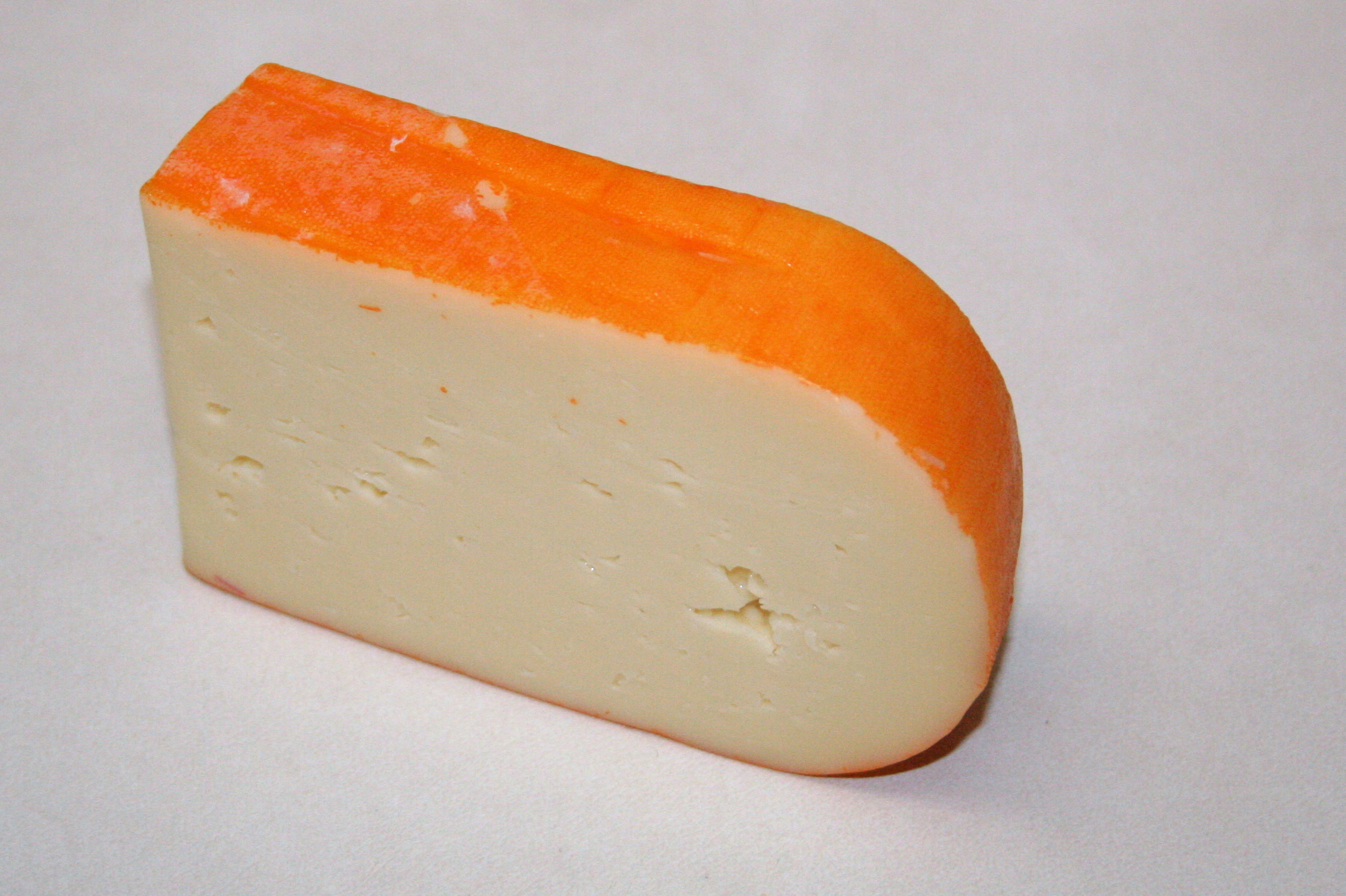
Mahón cheese

A local cheese is produced in Menorca: Mahón cheese. The cheese is classified as holding denominación de origen status in Spain, marking it as a unique product of the region. The cheese is pressed and has a characteristic orange colour, and rounded corners. In 1985, the protected name of the cheese was set as queso Mahón, and later, in 1998, the word Menorca was added, making the full name Mahón-Menorca. There are four main varieties, according to maturation time: mild, semi-mature, mature and aged. Ricotta or fresh cottage cheese is also made in dairy shops in Menorca.

== Cold cuts ==
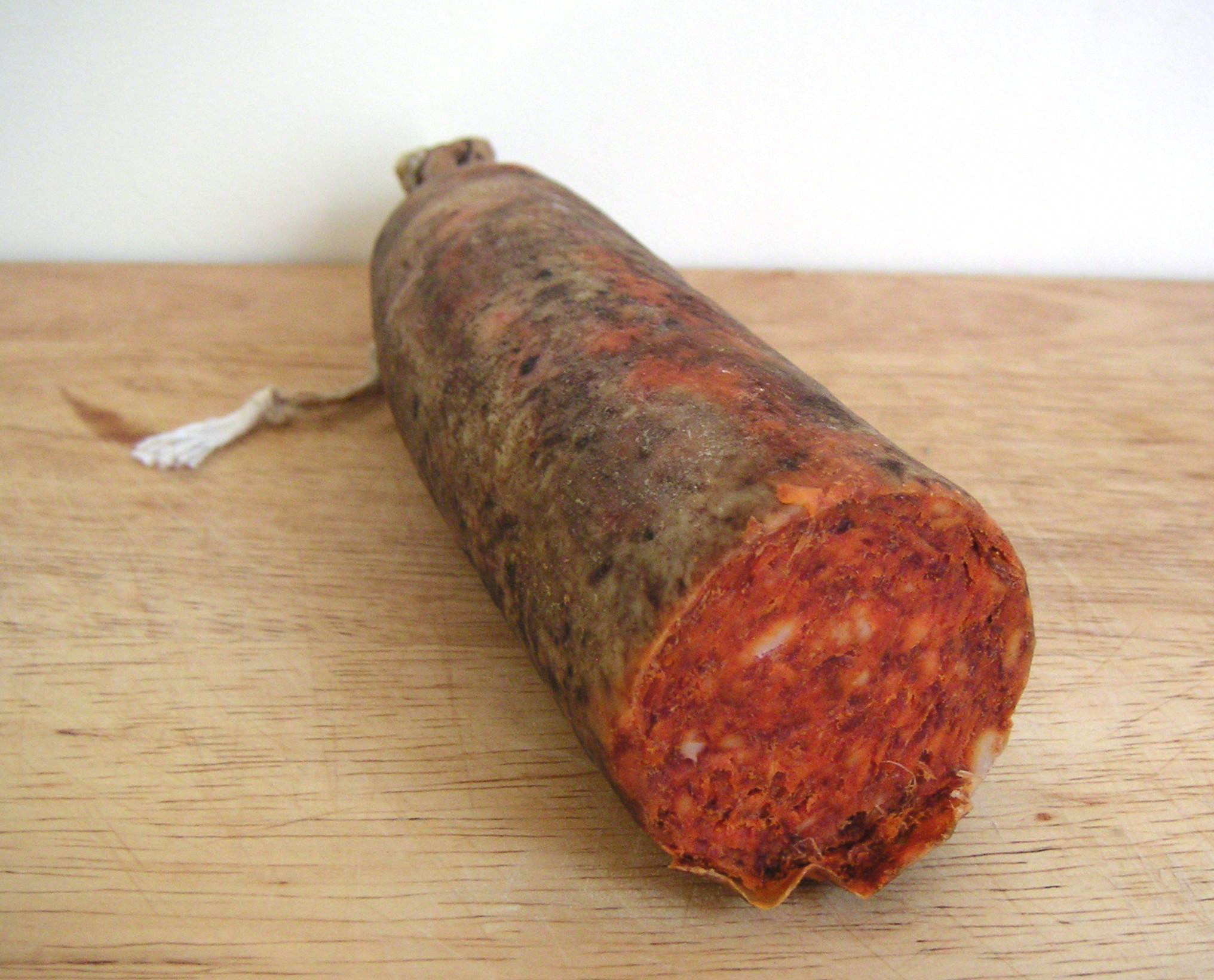
Menorcan sobrassada

With the exception of sobrassada, pork cold cuts made in Menorca are an evolution of the Roman legacy. The slaughter of the pigs, usually undertaken in winter, is called porquejades or porquetjades. Blood is added as an ingredient to some of these products, which gives them a black colour.

Similar to Catalan cuisine, only a few spices are used, but give each product a distinct flavor. Typical spices include black pepper, white pepper, paprika (in sobrassada), anise, cinnamon and salt. Some also add other typical Mediterranean spices such as thyme, rosemary and oregano.

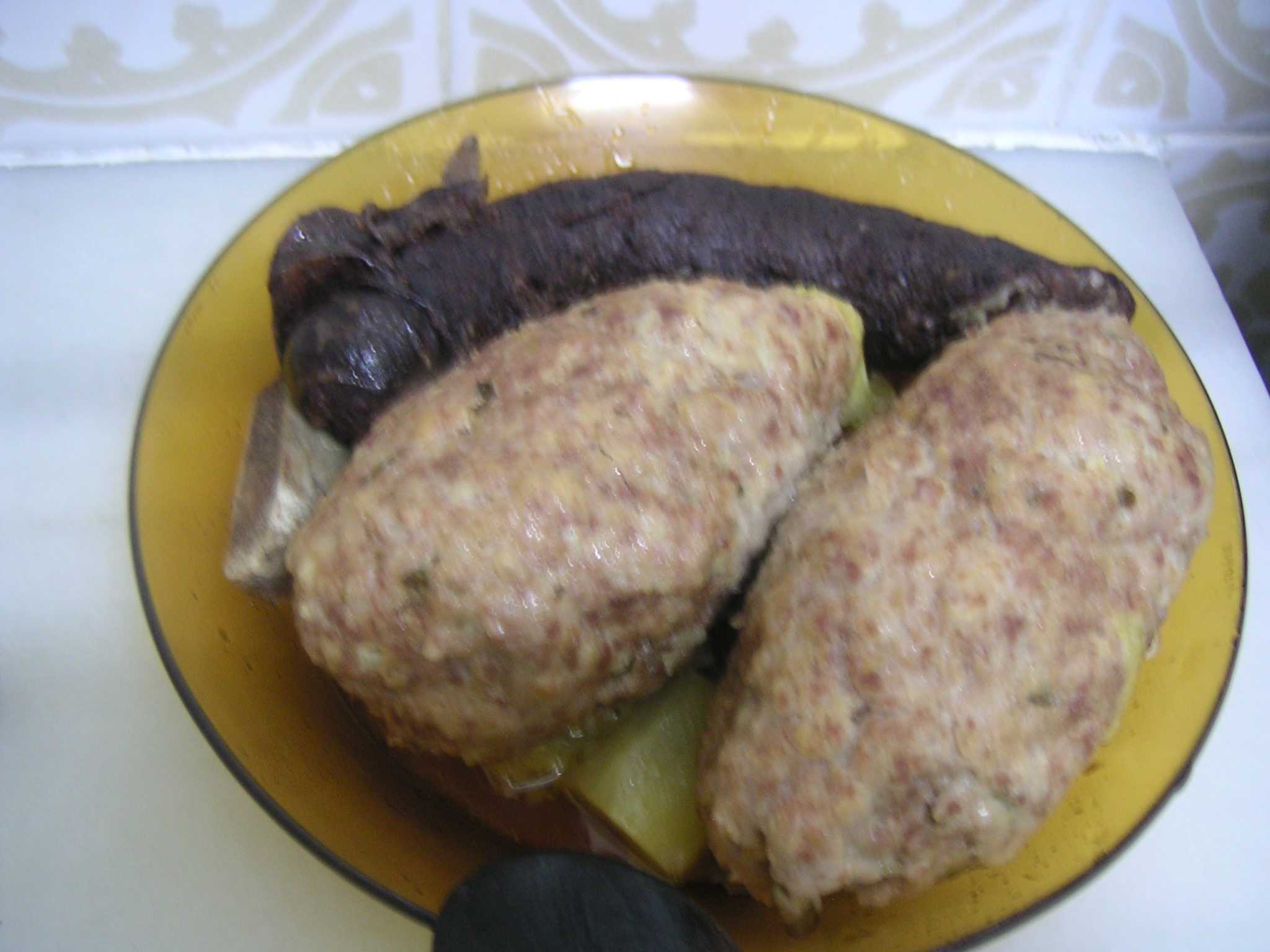
Piles and butifarras of escudella

• White botifarra has a grayish, clear brown color, since it doesn’t contain blood, and has the form of the ball that is used for escudella. It is made of meat and other parts of the pig and it is surrounded by a fine membrane. It is generally eaten cooked, usually fried.

• Black botifarra has the same ingredients and species as the white, but also contains pig blood. Its shape is like a fine botifarra. It is often eaten fried with sobrassada and it is sometimes eaten raw.

• Camallot, is a cooked, black, and very greasy sausage, basically the same as Mallorcan camaiot but with less pellets. It usually contains minced pork, pig’s blood, black pepper, a pinch of paprika and anise. Its appearance is very different from the others, since it is inserted within a pig leg, where the name comes from. It is eaten raw, cut in very fine slices, or cooked.

• Carnixulla is a cured raw sausage of chopped lean meat mixed with bacon cut in small squares and marinated with salt, pepper and sometimes other spices. The production process goes through a drying process inside the intestine while other transformations take place. Unlike with sobrassada, fermentation does not take place. This cold cut is the only one specific to Menorca, and perhaps the oldest one of the island.

• Menorcan sobrassada is thinner and less spicy than that of Mallorca.

== Traditional dishes ==
=== Vegetables, legumes and greens ===
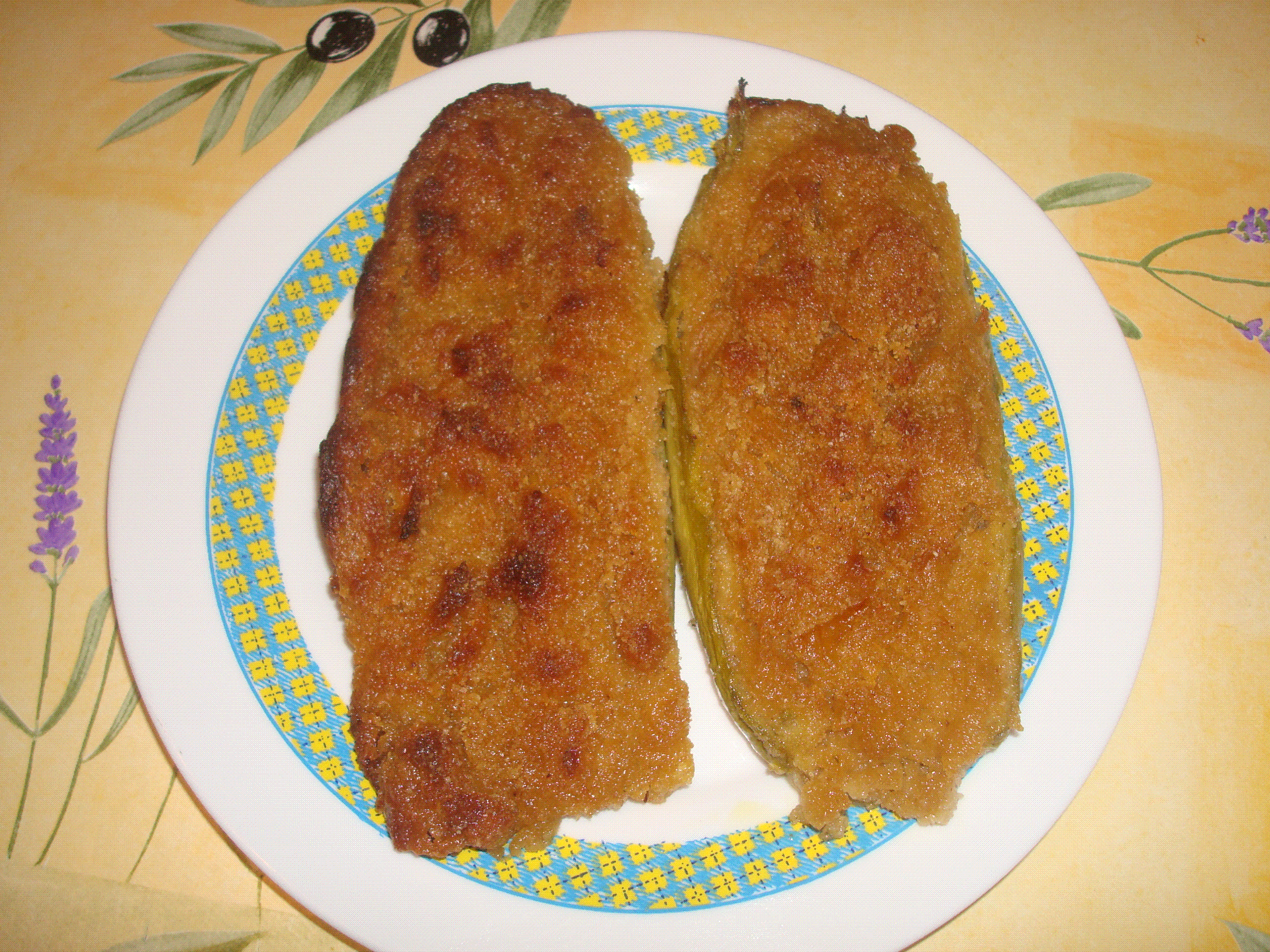
Stuffed zucchini.

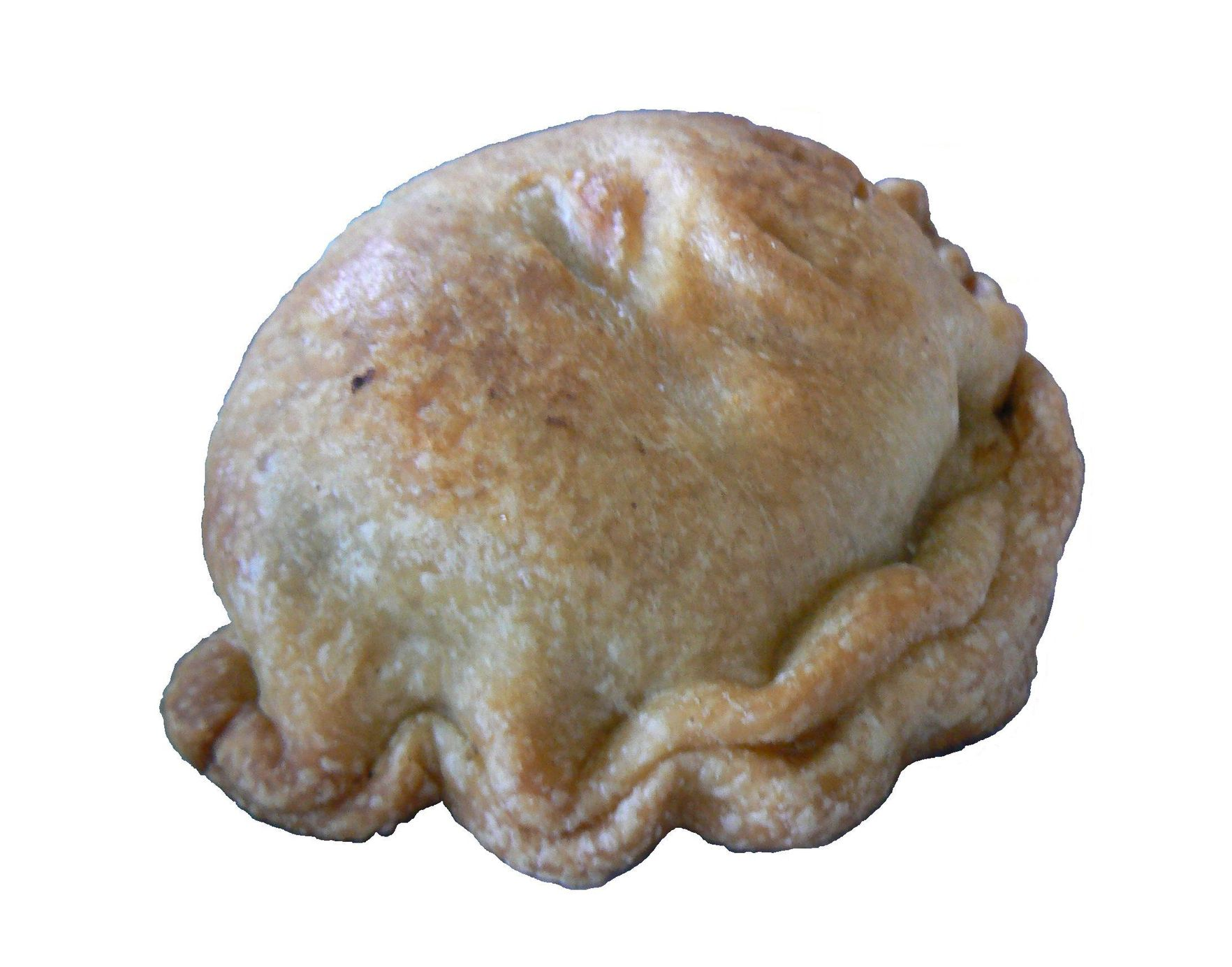
Spinach Rubiol, traditional dish from the patronal feasts of the island

Menorcan cuisine is very Mediterranean, rich in vegetables of all types. The island has been very self-sufficient providing these types of fresh products, thus they have never gone missing, thanks to the farming activity as part of the economy even to this day, time in which the crops represent approximately half of the Menorcan territory. The salad, hanging, bouquet tomatoes, etc., and other green vegetables to prepare salads and stir fry stand out—onions, Italian green peppers, red pepper, garlic—, Roman lettuce to prepare salads, Mediterranean green vegetables that are fried, stuffed or oven baked, like eggplant, that in Menorca is small and very white in its interior, a variety of the summer season that cannot be cultivated in a greenhouse, zucchini, that is prepared in a similar way, or the artichoke, that is also from a local variety, small, long, and purple-colored, that is eaten mainly as a side dish, battered and fried, oven-baked or in stews.

Fruits are also abundant, especially figs, that are also eaten in savoury dishes, like for example the oliaigua.

Local green vegetables are prepared a "thousand ways", some of the most common are the guixons, the habas, the lentils, and the chickpeas.

Mushrooms are very much appreciated, oven-baked, fried, with or without sauce to accompany meats, and the wild asparagus, very appreciated in the oliaigua (local soup) or simply with a tortilla.

Olive oil is the grease that is used to cook these dishes and is also common in pastry, while olives themselves are appreciated in this cooking, just like local capers. Until a few decades ago there were hundreds of olive trees in Menorca but nowadays these are not cultivated.

Some Menorcan dishes that contain these ingredients are:

- Oven baked eggplant: a species of local eggplant is used that is smaller and more tender, they are thinly laminated and oven-baked in a single layer, covered in shredded bread, with minced garlic and basil. It is similar to the carbassonada, made with zucchini instead of eggplant, and usually has chopped onion and is eaten in the other Balearic Islands. Oven-baked tomatoes and stuffed zucchini are also traditional.
- Oliaigua, which in its origin was the scantiest soup, food for when ingredient were scarce. It is usually eaten with figs during the summer.
- Perol, consists of a layer of laminated potatoes, another of laminated tomatoes, covered with shredded bread, garlic, basil and grilled.
- Cuttlefish with fesols is a stew with fresh cuttlefish and peas, it is very common that is also traditionally served as a tapa. Sometimes little balls of minced meat are added.

A lot of salty products are made with wheat flour, many of which the bread dough often encircles the land's produce, like for example, the rubiols, the Minorcan flaons- salty pasta filled with cheese-, to the agujas or croissants – made with bread dough and shaped like a half moon – filled with sobrassada. The formatjades stand out, common in Easter time. The salty cocas are usually rectangular, open or closed, and can be traditionally filled with a stir-fry, vegetables or pepper, even though some have meat or fish. On Christmas Eve, it is common to eat, before the Midnight Mass, bread rolls filled with diced meat and soaked in milk and oven-cooked.

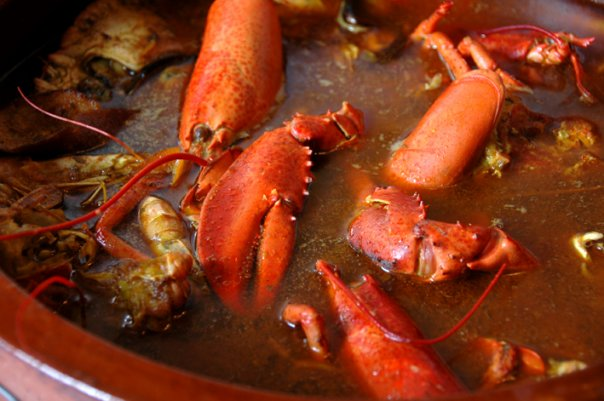
Kaldera or as it's best known, lobster kaldereta.

=== Fish and seafood ===
Sea products, for their insular condition, are widely consumed. Traditionally, Whitefish is used just the same- like for example, Goosefish or the Hake- like the Oily fish- like the Atlantic mackerel or the sardine, for example-, very fresh, bought the same day it is fished. The Scorpaena or scrofa, among them, is a highly appreciated and abundant fish. Another appreciated fish is the Rajiformes that can be oven-baked, grilled or in a paella.

A number of seafood, shells and mollusks are also used. These products, just like the earth products, change according to the season. They are cooked in pots or boilers, rice, and sometimes also in salty pies or puddings, oven-baked, grilled or in the oven. In Menorca there is a great tradition of eating varied fish, and even octopus or squid, in the form of meatballs. The cod ab burrida, that is prepared mixing cod sauce with garlic and oil dressing, is a dish that has the resemblance with others cooked in Catalonia, Provence, and other nearby areas.

Some Menorcan dishes with fish and seafood are:

- Stuffed calamari, oven-baked or in a saucepan, it is an elaboration that has been established in the Menorcan cookbook and has an established reputation for its subtlety of aromas.
- Lobster stew: until not long ago this type of sauce or bread soup was a poor fisher's dish, since Menorcan's lobsters were easy to find. Add bits of lobster on top of onions, tomato, garlic, and parsley and boil over high heat. Kaldereta is the best known internationally Menorcan dish, and of all the Menorcan pots the most emblematic is lobster. Other pots that are prepared a lot are made of fish, usually roca fish, like the grouper pot.
- Baked common cockle, covered with shredded bread, garlic, and parsley.
- Cabracho (scorpion fish) meatballs,

=== Meats ===
Pig farming is common locally, because pigs are easy to raise and traditional sausages are very popular. There is also cattle farming, which is the traditional source of milk -to make cheese among other things, meat and hides; the latter being used as a raw material for the local traditional leather craftsmen^{8}. A very old recipe is, for example, the Feixets or Chaplain’s Partridges, thinly sliced veal rolls filled with boiled egg, bacon and sobrasada.

Lamb, chicken and rabbit are also consumed. There are local varieties of chicken and lamb.

Game meats, which are currently very limited, are mainly rabbits and birds. Rabbits are hunted with the help of dogs, including an indigenous breed, the Rabbit’s Dog, and shotguns, while for the haunting of birds, typical techniques are the use of decoy and the fencing in the neck.

Snails are also part of this gastronomy, both in simple preparations, with alioli, for example, and in many more sophisticated ones, such as snails with sea crab.

Some Menorcan dishes with meats or sausages are:

- Arroz de la Tierra, Rice of the Land; which is not made with rice but with wheat, crushed in a mortar, and baked with assorted sausages. It resembles the African couscous.
- Fried lamb or fried pork, sometimes called Frit Menorquí by the islanders.
- "Macarrones" with gravy, penne pasta and meat, cooked halfway between the typical Italian way - the pasta is cooked separately and then added to the rest of the ingredients - and the traditional Catalan way – the pasta is cooked at the end with the rest of ingredients, like the noodles’ casserole. It also has a British influence, where gravy is a kind of simple meat preparation serving as a bed for the pasta.

== Typical desserts and pastries ==
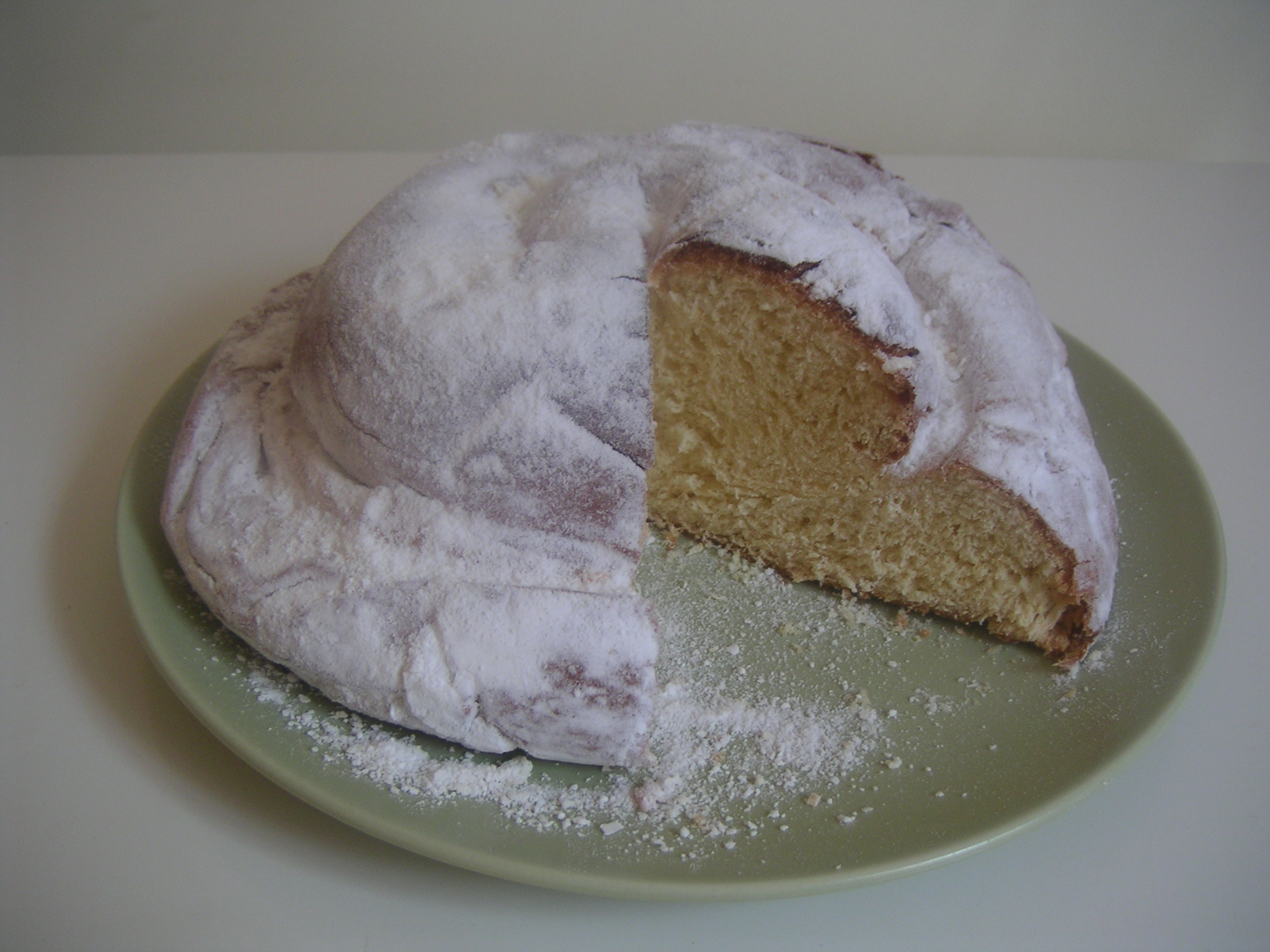
Coca bamba.

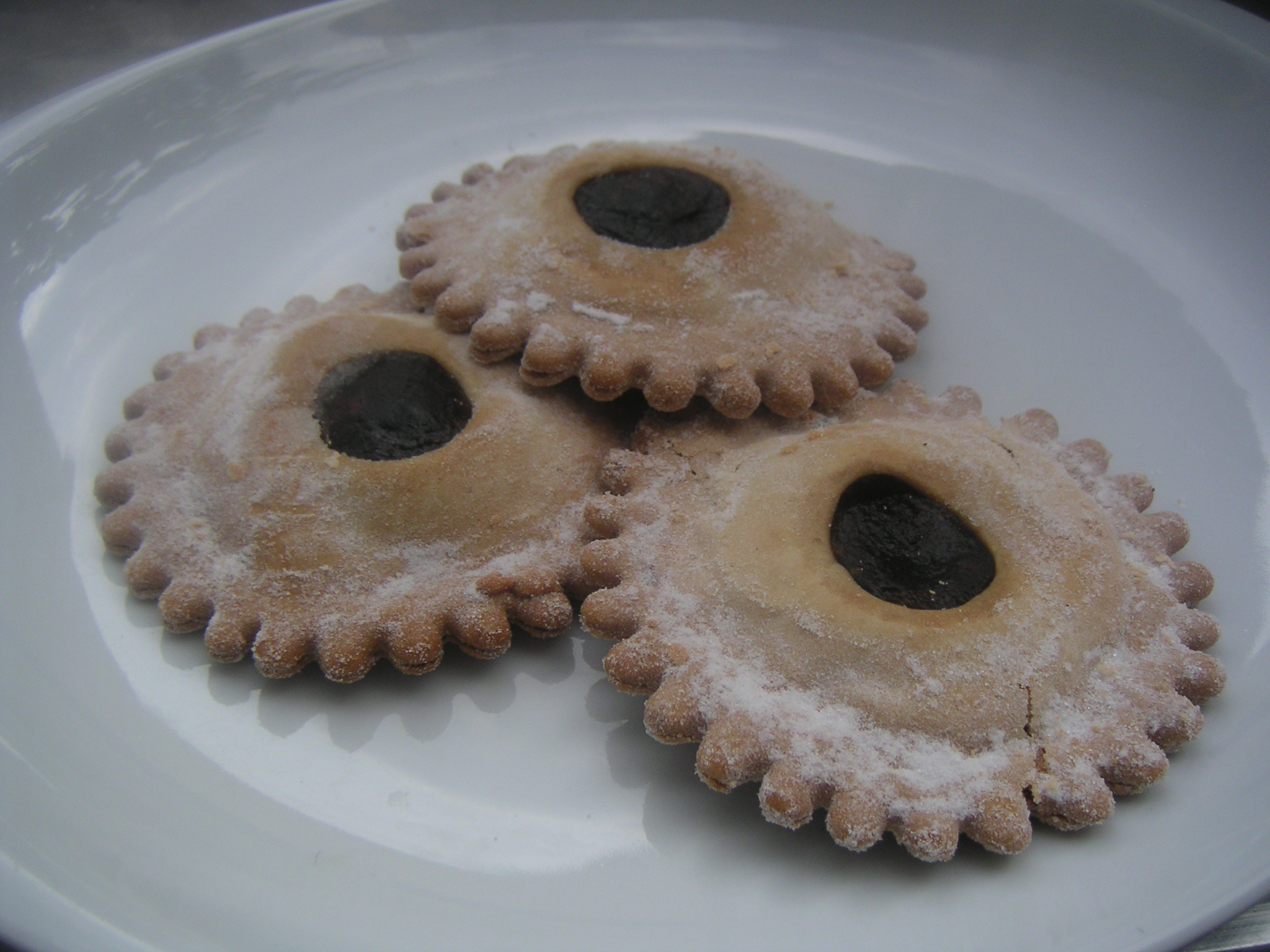
Crespells.

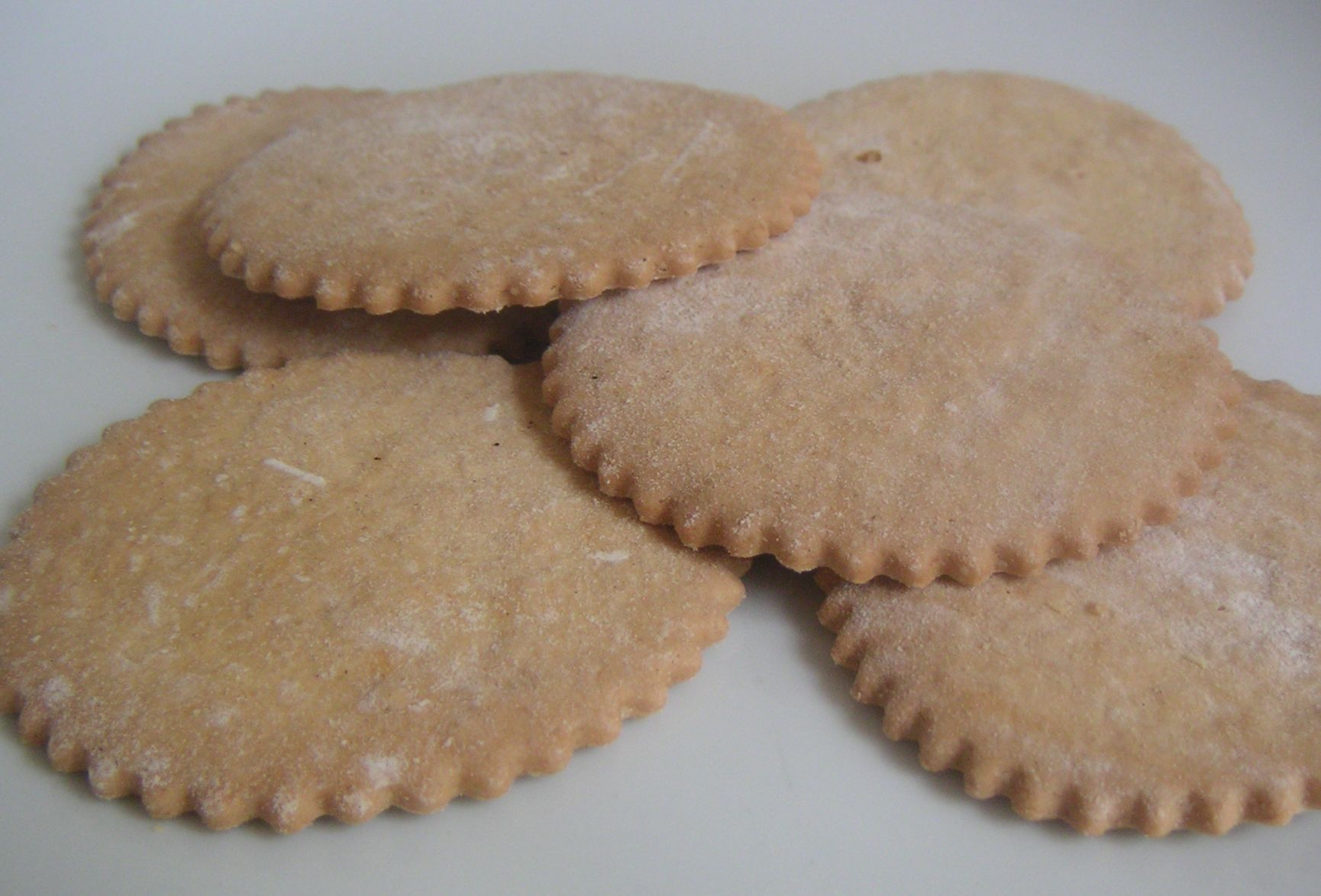
Crespellets.

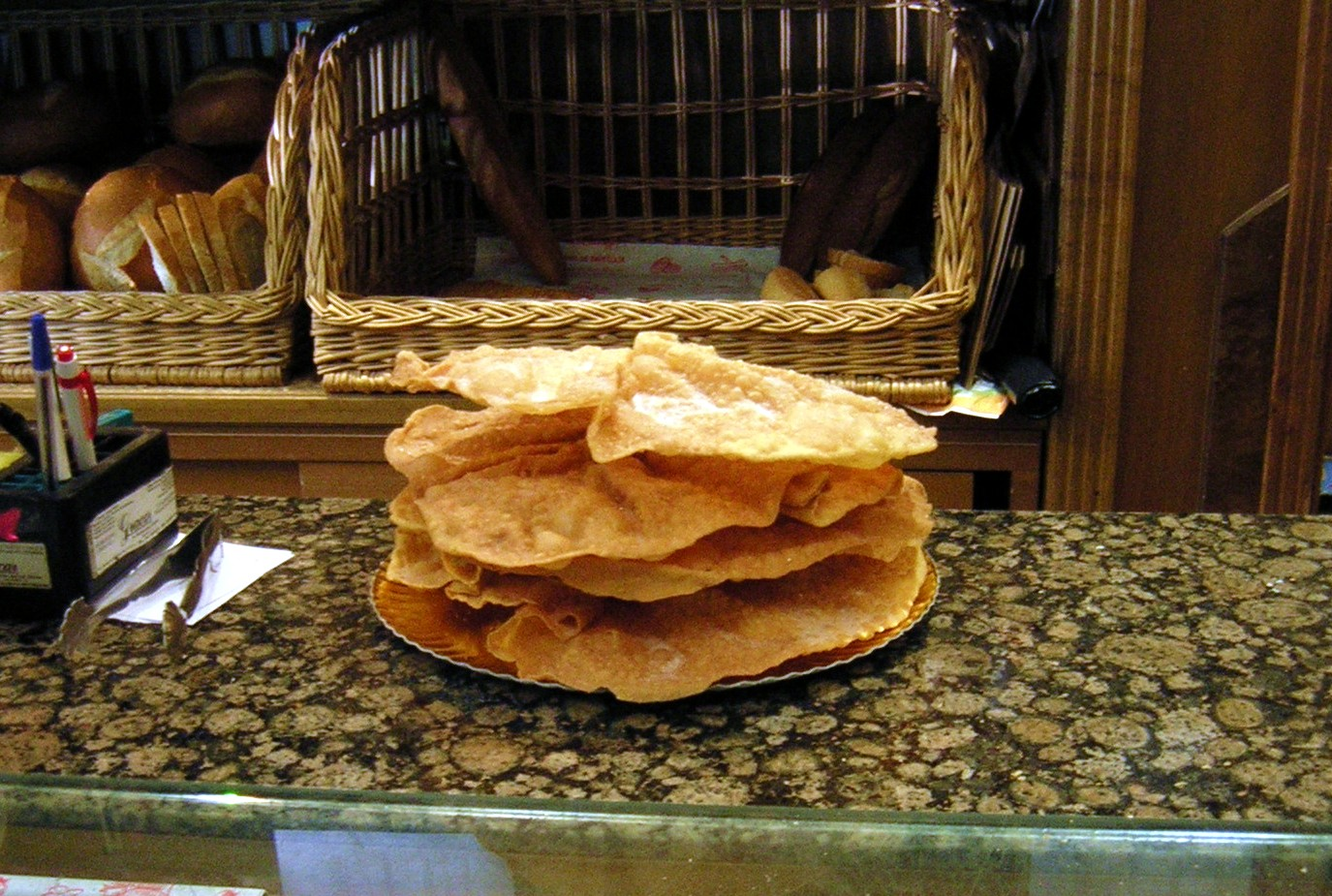
Plate of orelletes.

The Menorcan bakery, pastry, and dessert making incorporates ideas, techniques and products from cultures as diverse as Jewish, Arabic and English. The brief stay of the French in the island served to create the "Gató", according to the technique of the French housewives of the moment, but incorporating almonds in the recipe. From the British the islanders took a taste for puddings, they use Catalan cream abundantly; and they also use meringue in the Italian way, to take advantage of the egg whites to decorate desserts and cakes. This taste for very sweet recipes is shared in common with other neighbours in the southern Mediterranean.

- The "Amargos", or Bitters, are cookies made with egg whites and almonds, similar to Italian Amaretti with almonds, and to the French "Macarons".
- The Buñuelos de Todos las Santos, Fritters of All Saints, are made with soft cheese from Mahon for All Saints' Day, when the "panellets" are also cooked.
- The "Carquinyoli Menorquines", or "Carquinyols de Es Mercadal", which are square-shaped unlike the continental "Carquinyoli"s. They are like chocolate tablets, and have a homogeneous texture, although they are also dry and hard. They are made with almonds, egg white, sugar and flour.
- The "Coca de Tomate de Ciudadela", flatbread with slices of tomato, garlic, parsley, sugar and chopped cookie.
- The "Coca Bamba", or "Coca de San Juan" in Ciudadela, thick and tall in the middle flatbread in the form of snail that contains boiled potato and is eaten for breakfast, as an afternoon snack or with hot chocolate during the local festivities. "Pudin" is made with the "Cocas" that get hard after a few days of non-consumption. With the same recipe for "Coca Bamba" are also made individual round small Cocas, or "Coquitas", covered with apricots, cherries or other seasonal fruit. With the same dough are also made the "Buñuelos de Pasta Bamba" fritters.
- The Crespells of Menorca are flower-shaped cookies with about twelve petals, covered with fine sugar and stuffed either with jam or with a paste made of cottage cheese and lemon. They have a round hole in the middle to see what they are stuffed with. In the other Balearic islands "Crespells" are very different.
- The Crespellets or "Crespellines" are dry, round, large and thin cookies with a toothed edge.
- The "Cuscussó" has the appearance of a loaf of bread covered with candied fruit and pine nuts, like a "Coca de San Juan". The dough is made with Catalan style rustic bread, which is soaked in water with sugar; almonds are added, cinnamon, lemon peel, etc. And then it is kneaded again.
- The "Ensaimada" is made both in Mallorca and in Menorca.
- The "Formatjades de Requesón" are sweet "Formatjades" stuffed with a mixture containing cottage cheese and lemon peel.
- "Alayor" cookies are a kind of round bun with a "closed hole" in the middle. The dough has a bit of anise in it. They are eaten mainly at breakfast and as an afternoon snack, dunked in milk. They can be opened in half and spread with jam or honey. They can be soft or hard inside, we can know depending on the appearance of the outer surface layer.
- "Gató" is a kind of cake where the flour is replaced with chopped almonds.
- The "Macarrones de la Ciudadela" are small white cookies made with egg white, lots of sugar and sometimes also bits of almonds. They have a six-pointed flower shape.
- "Orelletes", which are pronounced "oran" in Menorca, are fried dough. They are thin, irregular and crisp, aromatised with muscat wine and served with warm honey.
- Menorcan "Pastissets", in Menorca are five or six-petalled flower-shaped cookies, covered with fine sugar and made with lard, flour, egg, sugar, lemon zest.
- "Pudin de Requesón Menorquín", or Menorcan cottage cheese pudding; with Alayor cookies and traditionally garnished with raisins and pine nuts.
- Pudding of Coca Bamba, sometimes made with Ensaimadas; like a custard dessert consistent enough to be cut into pieces.
- Grapes and cheese, a simple dessert.
- The "Rubiol" is a sweet empanada similar to the sweet "Pastisset" of Valencia, typical of Mallorca and Menorca.
- "Rissats", rectangular biscuits decorated with curled waves drawn on the surface with a fork. They are similar to the "Crespellines".
- "Tatis" are like the Catalan "Carquinyolis" but with chocolate.
- "Turrón Quemado", from Mercadal. A peculiar kind of nougat.
- "Tortada", a cake made of chopped almonds, is frequent in the Spanish gastronomy, which in Menorca has the particularity of being usually covered completely with burnt egg yolk and meringue, and sometimes also sugar. This decoration is very typical of the island, and is usually found in the "Monas de Pascua" - Easter cakes, birthday cakes, and "Brazos de Gitano" – Swiss rolls - which, if not filled with Catalan cream, are usually also stuffed inside with egg yolk.

== Typical drinks ==
- "Calent", an artisan drink that is infused with herbs, cinnamon, anise and saffron, and it can be drunk hot or ice-cold.
- "Estomagale" is a soft herbs liquor, with a very particular flavor and texture.
- "Frigola" is thyme in Menorca. In the islands, it is also a traditional digestive made with thyme flowers.
- "Gin de Menorca" comes from the British presence on the island in the 18th century. The Xoriguer distillery, which produces the well-known Gin Xoriguer, is located in the port of Mahón.
- "Licor de Rosas" is a liquor of roses. It is a liquor of Greek origin that was brought to the island by Greek workers and merchants in the eighteenth century and that in Menorca is served in the baptisms.
- "Pellofa", gin with lemon skin and a little siphon.
- "Pomada", gin with lemon juice.
- The Menorcan "Ratafia" is made by soaking herbs from the island in Aguardiente for eight days, it has lemon bark, green walnut, carnation, nutmeg and cinnamon in it. Other liquors are also made with Mahón chamomile, orange or lemon flower, etc.
- "Sengri", which is a kind of hot punch with aromatised wine, dating from the time of the British presence in the eighteenth century. In spite of the similarity of the word, it has nothing to do with the sangria.
- Wine has been produced in Menorca since time immemorial. Currently, there are four wineries: Viña Sa Cudia, Viñas Binifadet, Ferrer de Muntpalau and the Bodega Vino de s'illa in Alayor, which have the distinctive name of "Wine of the Land of the Island of Menorca" and have obtained international distinctions.
- The "Malvasía" began to be produced in Menorca when commerce started with ancient Greece, especially in Alayor and San Luis, but later it was lost. Since 2005, it has been cultivated again with vines from Corsica, which has similar geological and climatic features to those of Menorca.
- Fruit liqueurs. They are made by macerating the fruits in brandy.

== Gastronomic fairs ==
CuinaArt Menorca is a gastronomic fair that is celebrated every April since 2007 as a showcase for Menorcan products. It consists of exhibitors, debates, tastings, conferences, etc. It is aimed at all types of public.
