= Tombet =

Vegetable dish from Mallorca

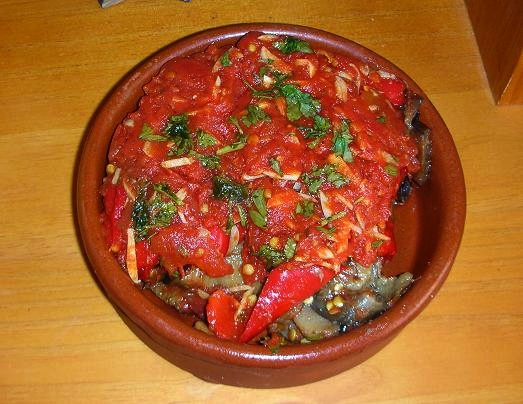
- Tombet in a terracotta plate
- Alternative names: Tumbet
- Course: Main course
- Place of origin: Spain
- Region or state: Mallorca
- Main ingredients: Potatoes, aubergines and red bell peppers

Tombet or tumbet is a traditional vegetable dish from Mallorca, consisting of layers of sliced potatoes, aubergines and red bell peppers previously fried in olive oil. It is available at almost every local restaurant on the island.

Tombet is often served along with fish or meat, but on its own it makes a good vegetarian dish.

== Preparation ==
The aubergines and red peppers should not be peeled. The whole is topped with tomato fried with garlic and parsley and presented in a way that it looks like a pie without a crust.

Tombet is the Mallorcan version of the Occitan ratatouille or the Catalan samfaina. Influenced by those dishes, nowadays some people add zucchini to the mixture, but this is a vegetable that is not present in the original dish.

== See also ==
- Ratatouille
- Balearic cuisine
- Catalan cuisine
- List of stews
- Spanish cuisine
- Valencian cuisine
