= Valencian cuisine =

Cuisine from the Valencian Community

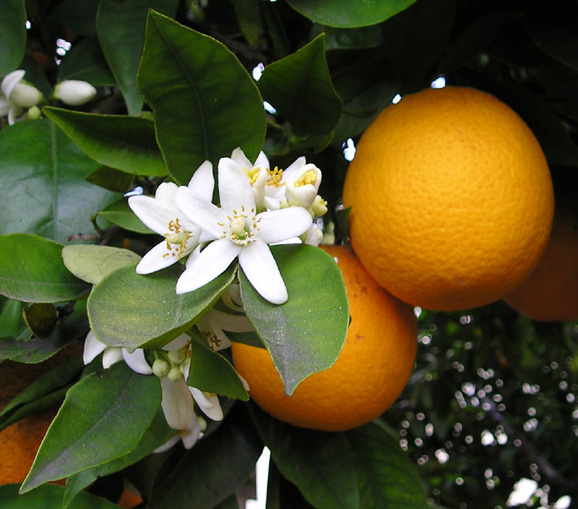
Oranges, typical fruit from Valencian Community

Valencian cuisine is a Mediterranean cuisine as cooked in the Valencian Community, Spain. Its basic ingredients are vegetables, seafood and meat. It is famous worldwide for its rices, such as paella, and its citrus fruits. The cuisine of neighbouring regions have contributed to and received important contributions from Valencian gastronomy, amongst them Balearic cuisine, Catalan cuisine, Aragonese cuisine, Manchego cuisine and Murcian cuisine.

== Main dishes ==
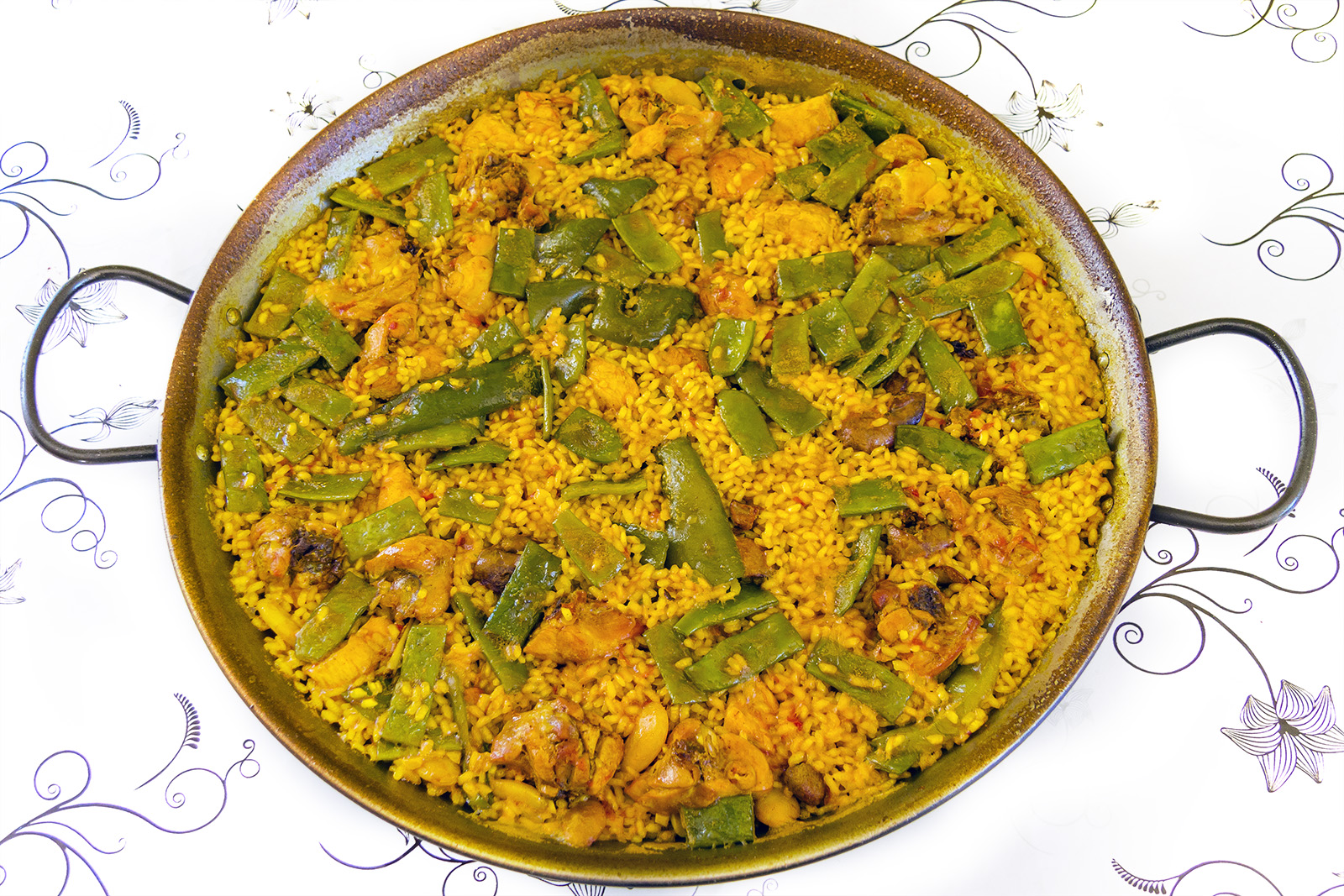
Valencian paella

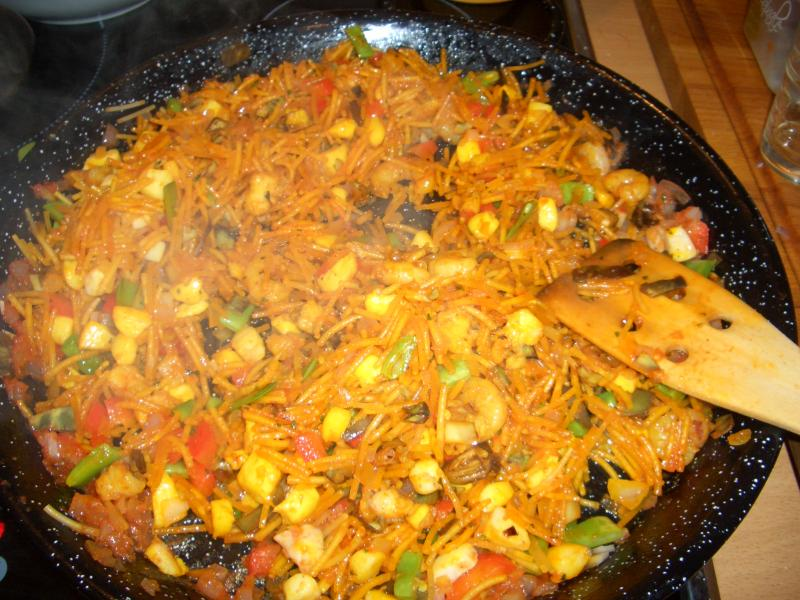
Fideuà

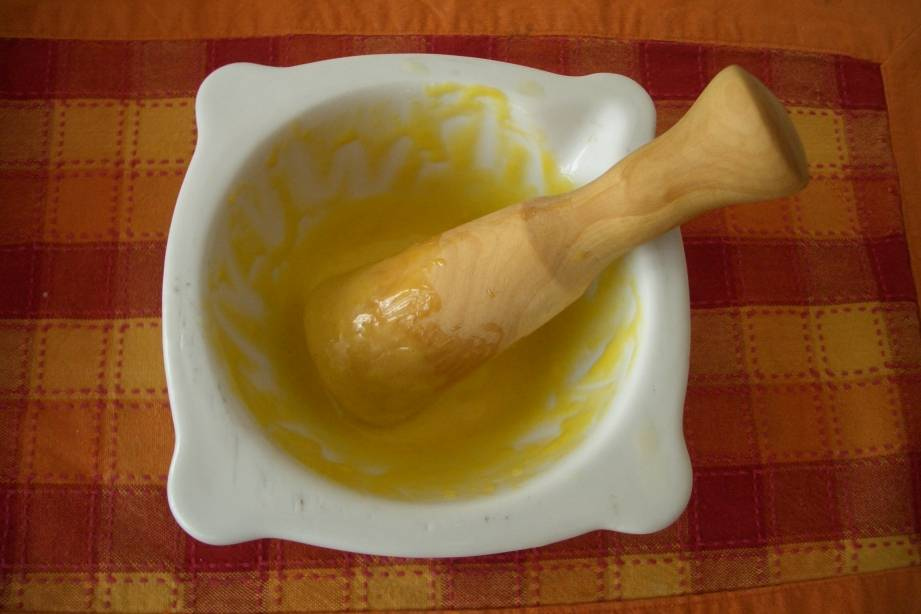
Allioli sauce

- Paella: The most famous Valencian dish is one of the most recent. Although many towns claim to be the birthplace of paella, it is usually considered native to Albufera and Ribera, just south of Valencia. It can be found in two main varieties, with chicken and rabbit or with seafood. Nowadays paella can be found around the world, especially throughout Spain and Latin America. The name comes from the large pan ('paella' in Valencian) where it is cooked.
- Arròs negre: Rice with squid and squid ink cooked in a paella.
- Arròs amb conill i caragols: Rice dish with rabbit and snails, amongst other ingredients cooked in a paella. It is typical of the south of Valencia and especially in the Vinalopo districts.
- Arròs al forn: A rice dish baked in the oven and usually containing sausages, chickpeas and potato amongst other ingredients, usually made with the surplus of the local typical stew.
- Fideuà: A dish based on noodles and seafood, typical of the Valencian coast and originally from Gandia.
- Arròs amb costra: A kind of arròs al forn but covered with an egg which provides the "crust" in the name. It is typical of most of the south of Valencia and especially of Elche.
- Gazpacho: A famous Spanish dish typical throughout south and central Spain. In the Valencia region it is typical of the southern and inland areas and is the quintessential summer dish.
- Arròs a banda: A humble preparation typical of the Valencian coast with rice, fish, and garlic.
- Embotits: Cured sausages.
- Sobrassada: A typically Majorcan meat product produced in the Marina.
- Bollit: Vegetable stew.
- Suquet de peix: An eel, potato, garlic and fish stew, similar to bouillabaisse.
- All i pebre: a signature dish for the area around Valencia city and immediately to the south, containing peppers, garlic and potatoes with eels.
- Esgarrat, or Pericana in the mountains of Alcoi: It is a mixture of roasted peppers and strips of salted cod. The pericana also adds garlic.
- Espencat: Roasted vegetables, typically peppers and aubergine but other vegetables can be added.
- Coques: Ancient local salty pastries.

== Sauces ==
- Allioli: This is a thick sauce, common to most of the Western Mediterranean, based on mixing garlic and olive oil to which egg is sometimes added. It usually has a characteristic yellow colour.
- Mullador: A sauce whose ingredients may vary but always includes tomatoes. The remaining ingredients depend on the time of year and the vegetables available in each area. There are similar preparations throughout the Mediterranean. Other names for this kind of sauce are "samfaina" in Catalonia, "tomacat" or "tombet" in Majorca and ratatouille in France; much simpler is the "salsa napoletana" in Italy. In Alcoi and further south, this sauce may include tuna as is the case with "pisto", typical of Castile la Mancha.
- Picada: This is a sauce composed of crushed nuts - usually almonds - olive oil, parsley and a little milk. It usually accompanies fish dishes.

== Sweets, apéritifs, desserts and drinks ==
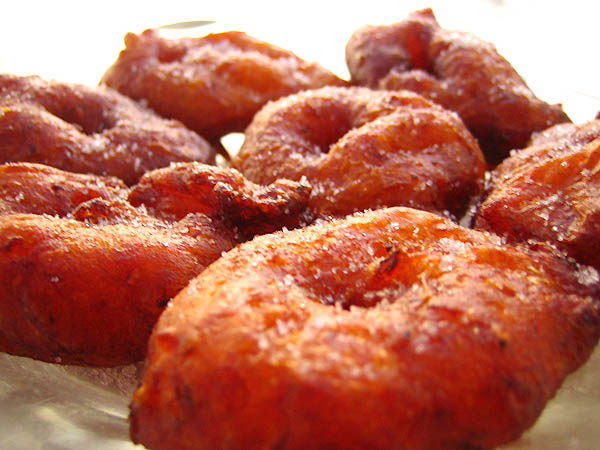
Pumpkin bunyols (bunyols de carabassa)

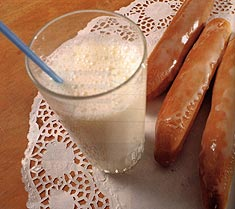
Orxata and fartons

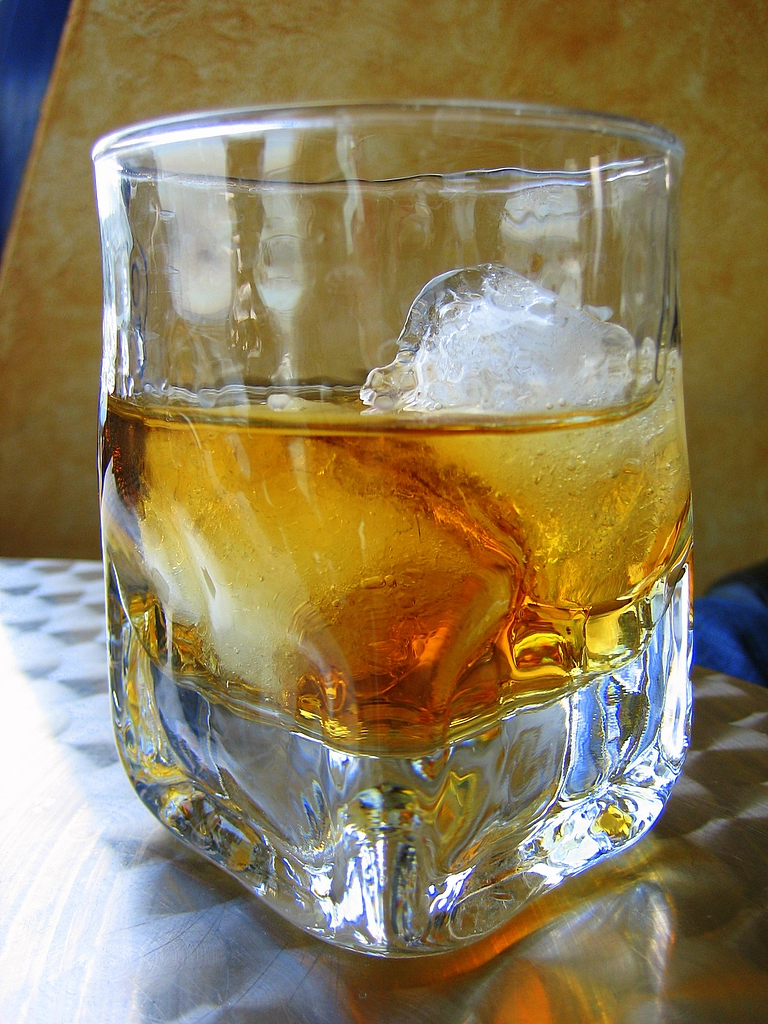
Mistelle glass

- Pestinyos: A small, sweet and dry pastry folded into three and flavoured with orange and aniseed.
- Pastissets: A typical sweet made of pastry with a sweet almond or sweet potato filling. It is of probable Arab origin and is typical of most of Valencia and the south of Catalonia. A similar dish, called rubiols, is typical in Majorca.
- Arnadí: typical of Xàtiva
- Coca (pastry): A kind of pizza or pie which can be either sweet or savoury. It is typical to most of Valencia as well as in some parts of Catalonia. The most common kinds in Valencia are the coca de llanda, a kind of sponge-cake, often pumpkin-, lemon- or apple-flavoured; coca de mullador - or coca de Sant Joan in Alicante - a small pizza-like pastry with ratatouille on top and occasionally tuna or other titbits; and coca de xulla, a flat bread with bacon and sausages on top. "Coca de molletes" typical of Alicante with soft salty flour crumbles.
- Coques de dacsa: Originally from Ròtova near Gandia and commercially available in the area around Denia and Gandia. These are flat pastry bases similar to Mexican tortillas, and topped with various titbits such as mullador. A similar preparation are coques de mestall, from the neighbouring county Valldigna.
- Arrop i tallaetes: A dessert which immerses fruit pieces in a sweet syrup made from grape must.
- Fartons: These are pastry fingers designed to be dipped in orxata.
- Orxata (Horchata): A drink made from submerging rice or other products in water for long periods. There are at least two kinds made locally. The first is Orxata de Xufa, made with tigernuts, quintessentially Valencian and produced only in the area of Alboraya, just north of Valencia. The second is Orxata d'Ametlla, made and consumed in the Alicante and Xixona.
- Peladillas (Jordan almonds). Typical from Casinos.
- Torró: A kind of nougat, traditional to Xixona and Alicante, available in two styles, hard and soft.
- Figues albardaes: A kind of fig fritter that are traditional during Falles
- Bunyols: Yet another Arab-inspired pastry, these are dough balls which are fried and covered with sugar, which can be found in various parts of Mediterranean Spain such as Cadaqués, as well as in Madrid or even Latin America although in these cases they are not sweet. The Valencian variety habitually includes pumpkin in the dough, though often in commercial preparations this is not so. They are typical of Falles.

== Wines and liquors ==
Valencian wines are also well-regarded, with three Protected Designations of Origin: Alicante, Utiel-Requena and Valencia. In Utiel-Requena, sparkling wine is made under the cava denomination. Meanwhile, muscat (known as "moscatell" also called "mistela") is produced in the Marina Alta (near Denia) under Alicante DO and also in Turís, Cheste, Godelleta and surroundings, under the Valencia DO.

== See also ==
- Arroz a la valenciana, a rice dish typical in Portugal and Latin America and inspired by paella.
- Hundred Burgers, a gourmet burger restaurant chain based in Valencia
