= Samfaina =

Catalan-Valencian dish

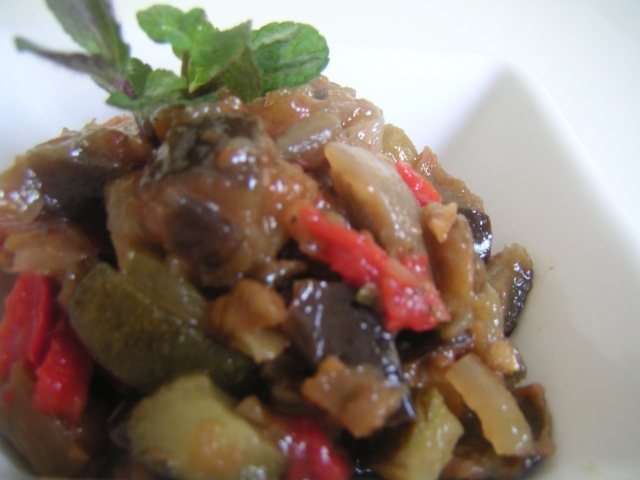
Samfaina catalana.

Samfaina is a Catalan-Valencian dish based on diced eggplant and zucchini, a sofrito of chopped garlic and onion and grated tomato, cooked in olive oil. Other ingredients like red and green peppers can be added, as well as herbs like thyme and rosemary.

In Catalonia it is usually eaten as an accompaniment to meat (typically pork rib, rabbit, chicken, etc.) or fish (tuna, cod, etc.). This is usually added to the pan or casserole to finish cooking with the samfaina. In the central provinces of the Valencian Community it is a typical ingredient in cocas.

== Origin and etymology ==
According to the Enciclopèdia Catalana the written word samfaina was encountered for the first time in 1890, and comes from the earlier samfònia which, in turn, comes from the Latin symphōnĭia (symphony).
