= Picada =

Sauce in catalan cuisine

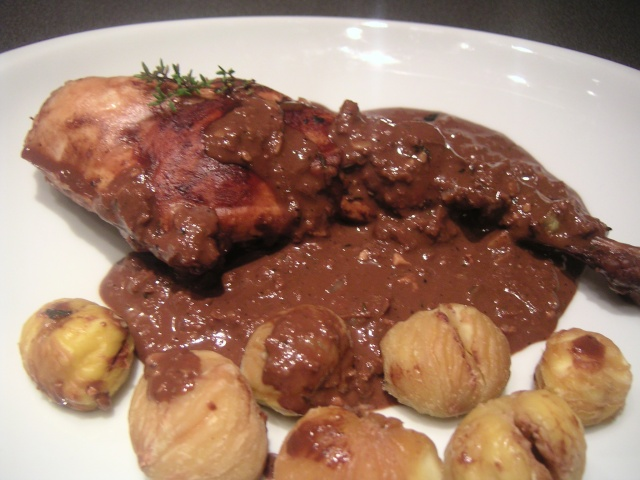
A dish seasoned with picada sauce

Picada (Catalan pronunciation: [piˈkaðə]) is a sauce and culinary technique found in Catalonia and Valencia, and therefore Catalan cuisine and Valencian cuisine. It is not a separate sauce like mayonnaise or romesco, but it is added as a seasoning during the cooking of a recipe.

== Preparation ==
Often the preparation of a concoction begins with another essential sauce, like the sofregit, and ends with the final adding of the picada some minutes before the cooking termination. Picada is used to blend and thicken juices, to provide an excellent finishing touch to a multitude of recipes: meats, fish, rice, soups, legumes, vegetables. There are many variants for the rest of ingredients. The most common ones are garlic (often considered essential), saffron (also considered essential), and parsley. Other possible ingredients used more rarely are cinnamon, cooked liver (of chicken or rabbit), chocolate, cumin, herbs, and other spices.

The picada is prepared in the mortar and must contain a basic triad: almond, bread and some liquid. Almonds are toasted and can be replaced by another nut like hazelnut, pinenut, walnut, or some combination of those. Bread is crushed in a mortar after being made dry and hard from going stale, being toasted, or being fried in oil. Otherwise, some sort of sweet biscuit or cookie may be used. The liquid used is usually the cooking juice but stock or hot water can be used as well.

== Historical background ==
Historically, picada of almonds is documented in Catalan cuisine since the 13th century. Picada is included in Robert de Nola's fifteenth century book Libre del Coch.

== Variants ==
Other neighboring Mediterranean cuisines, as Occitan and Italian, have essentially similar sauces such as pesto.

In Argentina "Picada" is a presentation of cold cuts such as ham, cured ham, pepperoni, sausages, and pates, and cheeses such as blue cheese, pecorino and parmiggiano. Normally served with dips, bread, olives and nuts.

== Bibliography ==
- Colman Andrews, Catalan cuisine: vivid flavors from Spain's Mediterranean coast
- Jaume Fàbrega, La Cuina Gironina, Barcelona, 1985. Graffiti Ed., ISBN 84-7222-748-0
- Jaume Fàbrega, La Cuina Catalana II: Per cuinar i acompanyar, Barcelona, 1995. Ed. La Magrana, ISBN 84-7410-806-3
- Josep Lladonosa i Giro, El llibre dels guisats i les picades, Barcelona, 2003, Ed. Empúries, ISBN 84-7596-474-5
- Ramon Parellada Garrell, El llibre de les picades, Barcelona, 2007, Ed. RBA, ISBN 84-7871-856-7
