= Coca (pastry) =

Catalan pastry

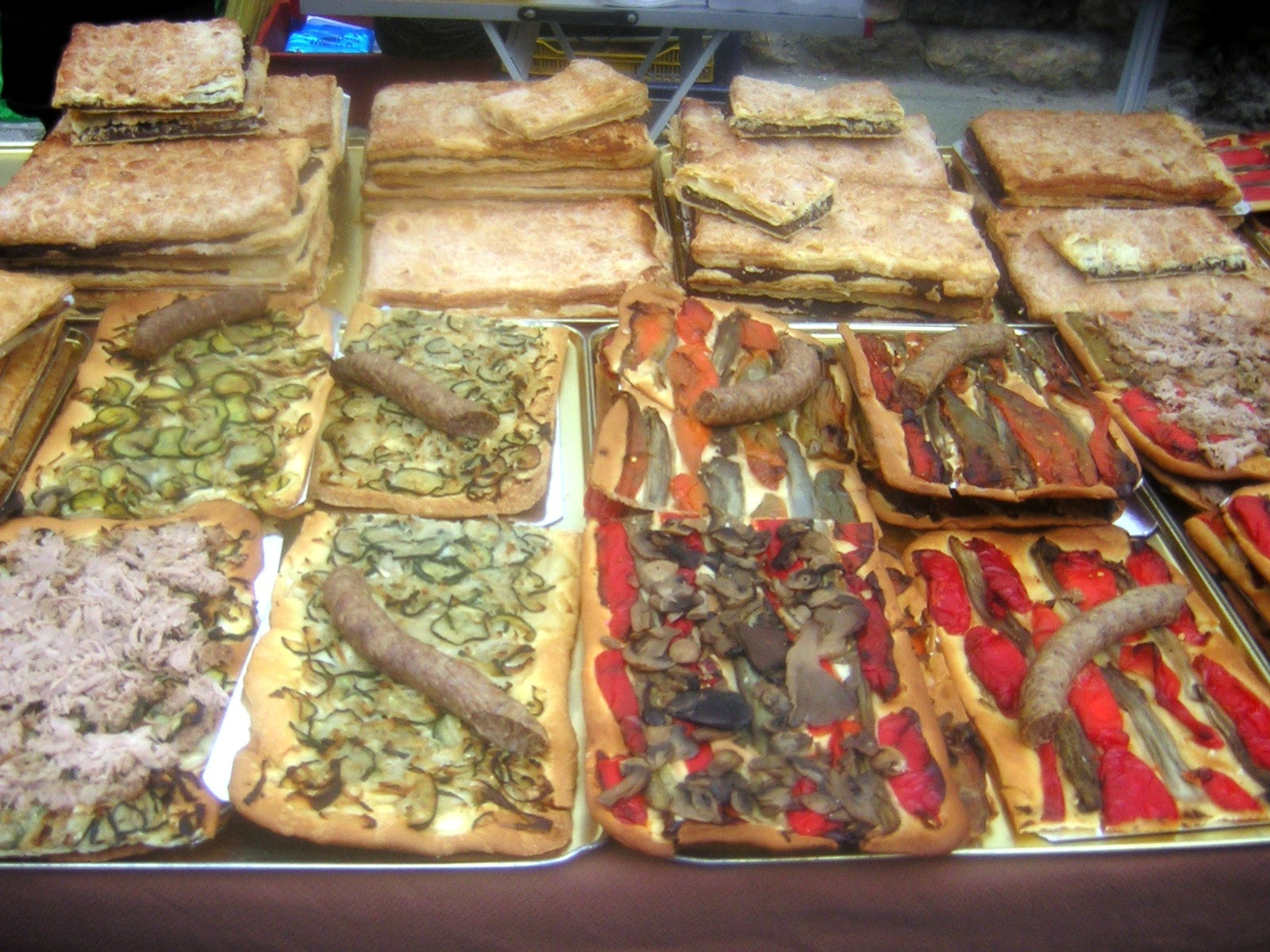
- Sweet and savoury cocas
- Type: Pastry
- Place of origin: Catalan-speaking lands
- Main ingredients: Sweet dough: eggs, sugar Savoury dough: yeast, salt

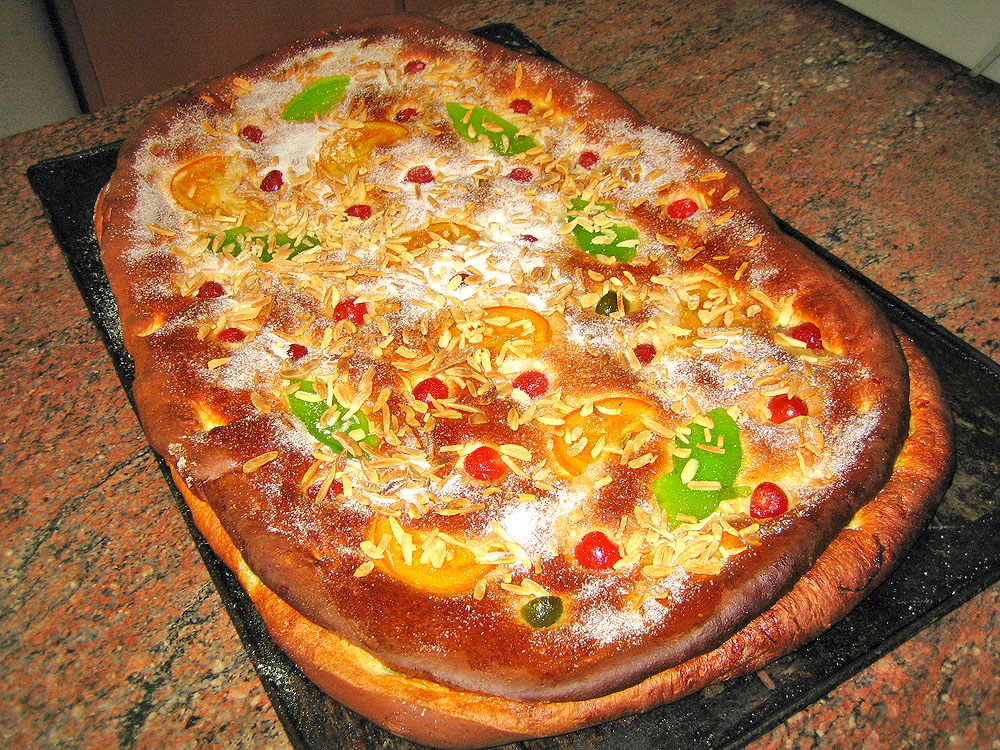
"Coca de Sant Joan", sweet coca with candied fruits and pine nuts, typical of Catalan summer solstice celebration

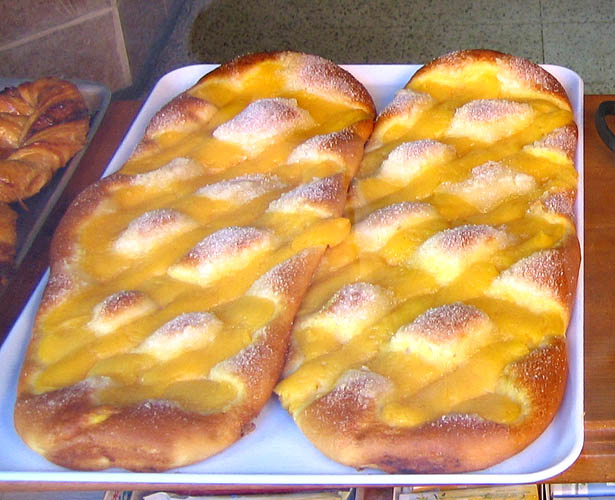
"Coca de crema", coca with Catalan cream, an example of sweet coca

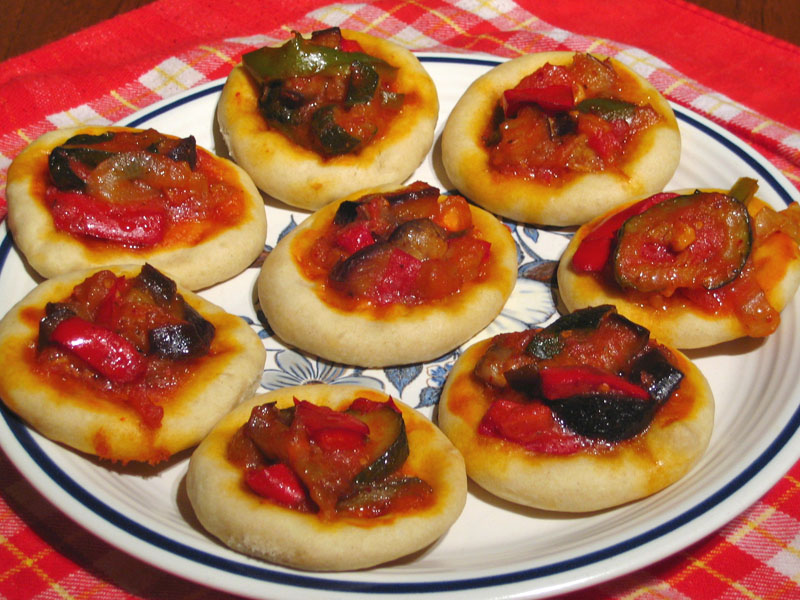
"Coca de mullador", a valencian variety of coca with samfaina, a dish similar to ratatouille, an example of the savoury coca

The coca (Catalan pronunciation: [ˈkokə]), coc or fogassa, is a pastry typically made and consumed in Catalonia, the Aragonese Strip, most of Valencia, the Balearic Islands, Andorra and in French Catalonia.

All around the Mediterranean there are similar typical dishes.

== Etymology ==
The word coca—plural coques—comes from Dutch during the Carolingian Empire, and shares the same roots as the English "cake" and the German "Kuchen".

== Similarities ==
There are many diverse cocas, with four main varieties: sweet, savoury, closed and open. All of them use dough as the main ingredient, which is then decorated. This dough can be sweet or savoury. If it is sweet, eggs and sugar are added, and if it is savoury, yeast and salt. As regards the topping or filling, fish and vegetables are usual at the coast whilst inland they prefer fruit, nuts, cheese and meat. Some cocas can be both sweet and savoury (typically mixing meat and fruit).

== Types of coca ==
Coca is almost any kind of bread-based product. Its size can vary from 5 cm up to 1 metre. There are various presentations:

- Sweet or savory, depending on the ingredients and condiments. A coca with no filling is called coca nua
- Open or covered.
  - The covered coca is a coca with its filling on the inside. It can be both sweet and salty.
  - The open coca is the typical coca with its content on top. Most cocas are like this.

== Varieties ==
Amongst the list of varieties, the most common are:

- Coca de recapte, a savoury coca with a variety of different ingredients, usually including sausage and vegetables, available generally.
- Coca de Reis also Tortell or Roscó. Similar to the Coca de Sant Joan but with a hole and filled with marzipan on the inside. It is habitual in all of Spain and France and is eaten on 6 January for Dia de Reis (Kings’ day). Traditionally, a king and a faba bean is put inside, the one who gets the king, gets to have the cardboard crown, while the one who gets the bean, pays for the next one.
- Coca de trempó, from Mallorca and the Balearics.
- Coca de Sant Joan, a sweet coca most typical of Catalonia, eaten on La revetlla de Sant Joan, Saint John's Eve.
- Coca de llanda, from the area around Valencia.
- Coca de xulla, often called coca de llardons, bearing bacon and other meat products, typical of any mountainous area.

The Other varieties are:

=== Savory ===
- Coca a la calda or escaldada. It is an open coca with tomato, sausage, blood sausage, Frigate Tuna or Tonyina de Sorra.
- Coca de carxofa. Literally: artichoke coca.
- Coca de ceba. Literally: onion coca.
- Coca de Dacsa. A thin and round coca with made to fill with any ingredient. Similar to a corn tortilla. Typical of the region of Safor.
- Coca d’espinacs. A coca made with spinach, raisins and pine nuts.
- Coca de Lleida. A coca de recapte with mushrooms, fish and regional sausages.
- Coca de Mestall. A round and flat coca decorated with sausages or sardines. Made in Safor.
- Coca de Montblanc. A coca with rabbit, tomato and olives. As the name indicates, it is made in Montblanc.
- Coca de Molletes. A typical coca from l’Alacantí.
- Coca nua. A thin coca without condiments.
- Coca d’olives. Literally: olive coca.
- Coca de pa. Literally: bread coca. A thin coca without condiments made in the Balearic Islands, served with sobrassada.
- Coca de peix. Literally: fish coca. Also made with shrimp.
- Coca de pernil i raïm. Literally: ham and grape coca.
- Coca de Pèsols. Literally; Pea coca. It also has tuna or sardines, and if there are none then sausages will be used. It also has garlic and faba beans.
- Coca de Tomaca. Literally: tomato coca.
- Coca de Tonyina. Literally: tuna coca. Also called Coca de Sant Joan. It is a samfaina but with onion and tuna. It is eaten in the Alacantí during the bonfires of Saint John.

=== Sweet ===
- Coca d’aire. Literally: air coca.
- Coca d’albercoc. Literally: apricot coca. Made in Lleida and Aragon.
- Coca d’ametlla. Literally: almond coca. Made in the Valencian region. It is produced in Castelló de la Plana.
- Coca d’anís. Literally: anise coca. A thin, thin and buttery coca filled with anise. Among others, typical of Osona.
- Cóc d’avellanes. Literally: hazelnut coca.
- Coca boba or ronyosa. A sweet and spongy cake made in all of the Valencian Community.
- Cóc borratxo. Literally: drunk coca.
- Coca de Brossat.
- Coca de Cabell d’Àngel. A puff pastry coca filled with Cabell d'Àngel and covered with pine nuts and sugar.
- Coca de carbassa groga. Literally: yellow pumpkin coca.
- Coca celestial. Literally: celestial coca. Made in Valencia.
- Coca de cireres. Literally; cherry coca. Typical of Reus and La Salzadella. In Reus it is individual and in the latter, bigger.
- Coca de Confitura.
- Coca de Creïlla (Valencian Community) or Coca de patata (Balearic Islands).
- Coca de Crema. Literally: cream coca.
- Coca dolça amb tallades. A sweet coca with sobrassada. From Majorca.
- Coca fina. Literally: thin coca. A sugared coca.
- Coca flonja.
- Coca de formatge fresc. Literally: fresh cheese coca. Typical of Vallespir.
- Coca garlanda. A coca with a hole typical of all the Penedès.
- Cóc de iogurt. Literally: yogurt coca.
- Coca de llardons. Made with lardons, then baked and covered with pine nuts. Typical of mountainous regions like the Pyrenees, even though it is present in all of Catalonia. It is traditionally eaten on Fat Tuesday.
- Coca de llauna. Literally: tin coca. Typical of the central Valencian Community. It is a spongy coca with orange juice made in a tin in the oven.
- Coca de Llavaneres. A coca filled with cream and covered in marzipan, sugar and pine nuts.
- Coca de llet. Literally: milk coca.
- Coca de llimonada. Literally: lemonade coca.
- Coca de maduixes. Literally: strawberry coca.
- Coca Maria or Coca bamba. A spongy coca similar to a tall ensaïmada. It is usually accompanied by hot chocolate. Typical of the Valencian region and Menorca.
- Coca masegada. Made with muscat and brandy.
- Coca de Montserrat or montserratina. A soft, long and narrow coca, covered with sugar, from Montserrat.
- Coca amb molles
- Coca amb nous. Literally: nut coca.
- Coca de pastanaga. Literally: carrot coca.
- Coca de pinyons. Literally: pine nut coca.
- Coca de poma. Literally: apple coca. Eaten around the Terres de l'Ebre and the Valencian community.
- Còc rapid. Literally: quick coca.
- Coca de Sagí, from Majorca.
- Coquetes de Sant Blai
- Coca de Sant Cristòfol
- Coca de sobrassada i mel. Typical of the Balearics.
- Coca de sucre. Literally: sugar coca. A coca with nothing more than oil and sugar. In the Balearics, they sometimes add sobrassada.
- Coca de Taronja. Literally: orange coca.
- Coca de Vidre. Literally: crystal coca. A long and very thin coca, with sugar and anise. That way, a transparent layer of caramelization happens, that is where it gets its name. Sometimes, pine nuts are added.
- Coca de Vilafranca
- Coca de Xocolata. Literally: chocolate coca. A sweet closed coca with chocolate.

== Festivities ==
"Cocas are (...) strongly linked with our country's traditions." The coca is a dish common to rich and poor and a basic part of Catalan cuisine.

In Catalonia, the coca has a direct relationship with the festa or holiday. It is typical to buy or prepare cocas during holidays, especially during Easter (Pasqua), Christmas (Nadal) and Saint John's Eve (la revetlla de Sant Joan). Some cocas even have the names of saints and they are eaten on that saint's day (such as the Saint John's Coca, Coca de Sant Joan). Nonetheless, many eat them without any religious or festive reason, and especially in places like Italy, this dish need not carry any special significance. The Coca de Recapte obeys this logic exactly, since the recapte is a kind of picnic habitually taken out into the fields.

== Similar recipes along the Mediterranean ==
Coca, being the Catalan variety of a Mediterranean dish, has local counterparts all over the Mediterranean, especially in its savoury kind. Apart from Italy, other countries also have similar cakes, pies and pastries. Four examples are the Algerian coca which is a variety of the Catalan coca, often presented as a closed square pizza filled with onions, red peppers, tomatoes, and spices, or shaped like empanadas which are from the same family as cocas; Pissaladière from Provence; the Lahmacun from Turkey and the Bouchée à la Reine from France, Belgium and Luxembourg, where it is one of the national dishes. Similarly, sweet pies can be found all over Europe. The more specific King's cake (in Catalan, Tortell de Reis) is traditional in Occitania as well as in territories of Catalan culture as a part of the New Year holidays.

== See also ==
- History of pizza
- List of pastries
- Regañao
