= Hundred Burgers =

Gourmet burger restaurant

Hundred Burgers is a burger restaurant chain based in Valencia, Spain. It was founded in 2020 by Alex González-Urbón and Ezequiel Maldjian.

== History ==
The concept of the restaurant was developed from 2017 to 2020. In 2017, González-Urbón and Maldjian traveled to New York to taste the 15 best hamburgers in the city in four days. In the following three years, the founders visited 22 countries and tasted over 300 burgers to develop their product.

In 2020, the first location opened in Valencia.

In 2023, Hundred Burgers became second-best burger in the world according to the World's Best Burgers list produced by Burgerdudes.

In 2024, Hundred Burgers became the first restaurant outside of the United States to top the World's Best Burgers list. This recognition is attributed to the restaurant's use of 120-day aged beef and "super crispy" bacon.

In 2024, 17 people reported having food poisoning after eating at Madrid locations of the chain.

In 2025, Hundred Burgers was ranked first on Burgerdudes' World's Best Burgers list for the second consecutive year.

In October 2025, Buenavista Equity Partners acquired an 80% stake in Hundred Burgers for an undisclosed amount.

== Locations ==
Hundred Burgers currently operates five restaurants in Valencia and three in Madrid.
