= Mahón cheese =

Spanish cheese

Mahón
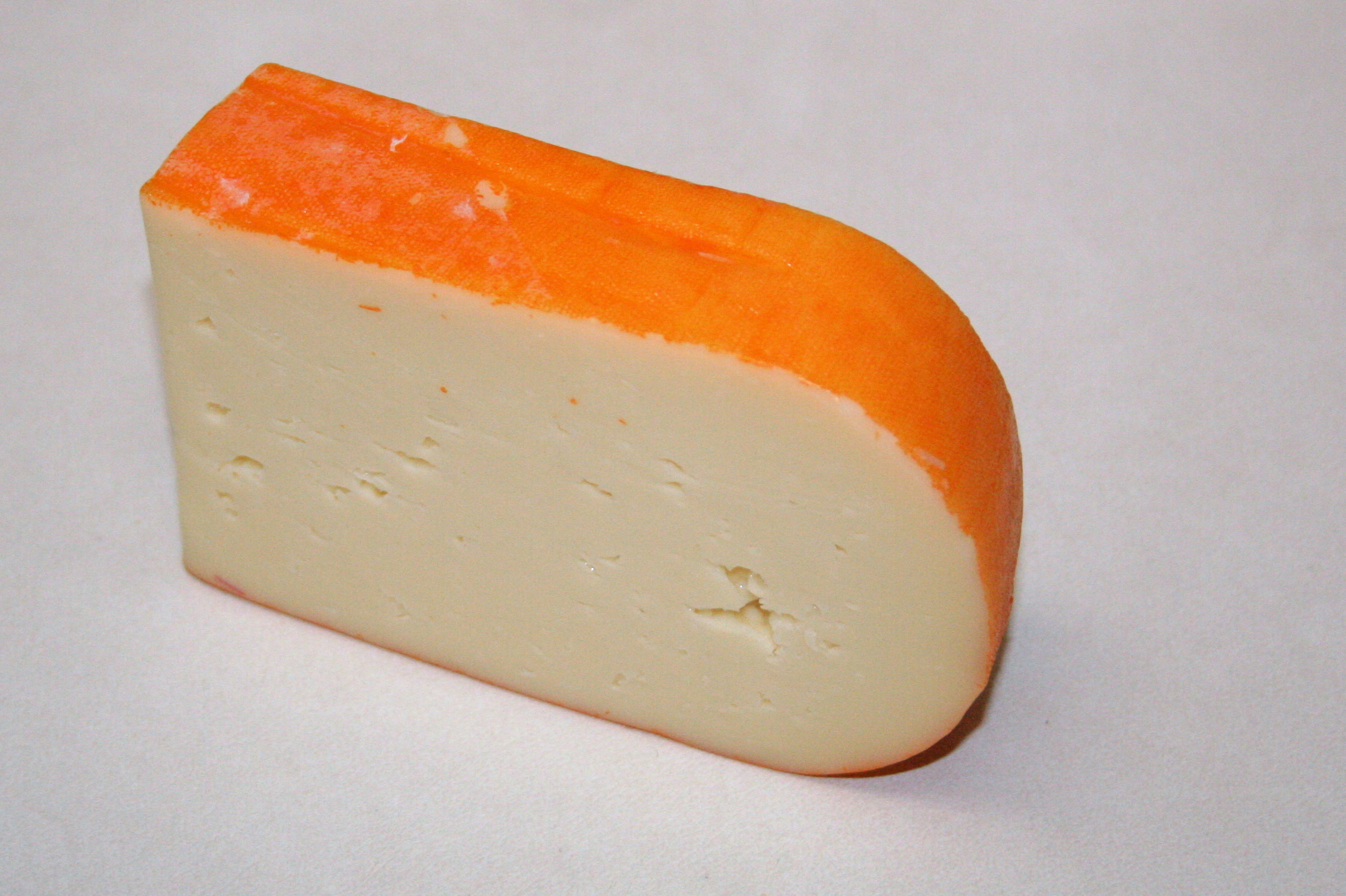
- Other names: Maó, Mahón-Menorca
- Country of origin: Spain
- Region: Balearic Islands, Spain
- Town: Mahón
- Source of milk: Cows
- Texture: Soft to hard
- Dimensions: 20 cm × 20cm × 9 cm
- Weight: 2–3 kg
- Aging time: 3 weeks – 2 years or longer
- Certification: DOP 1985

Mahón cheese (also Maó cheese; Catalan: formatge de Maó, Spanish: queso de Mahón) is a soft to hard white cheese made from cows' milk, named after the town and natural port of Mahón, on the island of Menorca off the Mediterranean coast of Spain. Menorca is known for its cheese production.

== History ==
Cheese is and has been an emblematic product of Menorca; made on the island with cow's milk, curdled at low temperature, salted by immersion and matured according to the customs of the island. Its production responds to ancestral traditions, being one of the pillars on which part of the history and livestock and culinary tradition of Menorca is based. Ceramic pieces have been found on the island around 2000 BC, or by other authors 3000 BC, which seems to have been part of the utensils used by farmers at the time to make cheese.

There are written documents from the 5th century that mention the production and consumption of cheese in Menorca, where it is worth mentioning as a well-known letter from Bishop Sever, written around the year 417, where he mentions in Latin that Menorcans ate milk and cow's cheese.

In 1985, the "Mahón Cheese" Designation of Origin was obtained and its Regulatory Council was set up. In 1997, the protected name was changed to "Mahón-Menorca Cheese".

== Production ==
Nearly a century ago, the gatherer-ripeners were said to have emerged as a class of island society in Menorca. Their work consisted of trading and distributing farm products, seeds, utensils, foods, etc. In exchange they would receive fresh cheeses that the farmers brought to their houses. In order to store them, the recogedores had caves for the careful and novel aging of the cheeses. They controlled everything in production, from the changing winds and temperature level to the correct handling of the product. In so doing, they obtained the original cheese from Mahón; soft, aired or cured, that they would then sell in diverse markets of the islands and the peninsula. Their careful techniques made famous Mahón cheese, and helped to make it a sought-after export.

Menorca's cattle are skillfully bred and have some of the highest milk production in Spain. All the milk from the 600 or so farms goes into dairy products.

In 1985, the cheese from Mahón received the Denominación de Origen.

== Characteristics ==
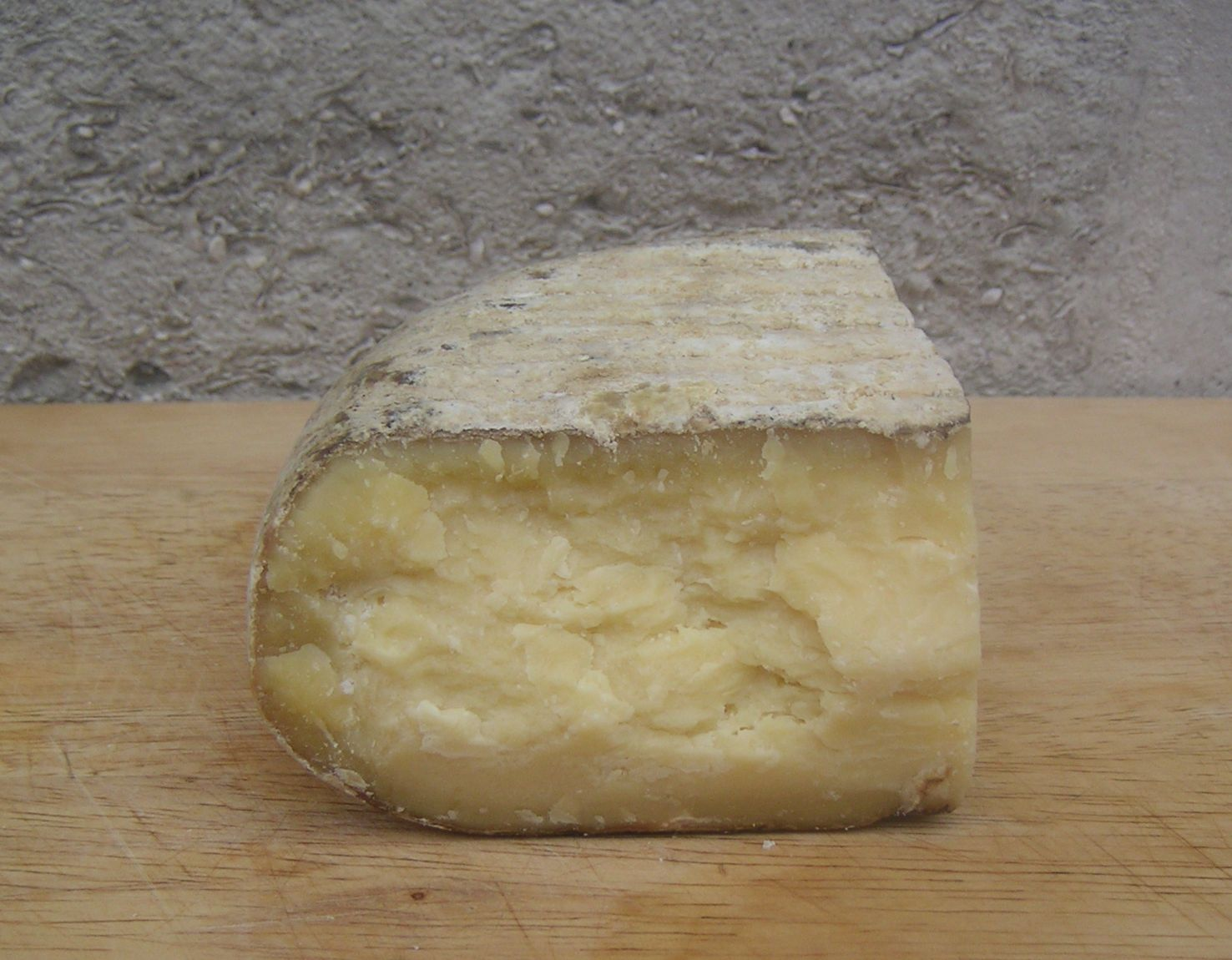
Mahón-Menorca old cheese

Mahón has some characteristics specific to it, despite aging. In general the cheese is buttery sharp, slightly salty and lightly aromatic (sweet and nutty aromas) in taste.

Mahón's sweet and fruity but at times slightly salty taste is due in part to the sea salt content in the grasses the cows eat. The rind is generally an orange color due to the rind being rubbed with butter, or oil, and paprika. As it reaches maturity (around 10 months) it tends to have small misshapen holes and has some granularity. In general, all aged Mahón has a proliferation of tiny holes.

=== Young Mahón (artesà) ===
Maó artesà or Mahón artesano (Catalan and Spanish for "artisanal Mahón", respectively) is young, aged no longer than three months, and softer than traditional Mahón. It is important to keep young Mahón in the vegetable compartment of a refrigerator or cooler. It should be stored in airtight plastic wrapping to preserve its softness.

=== Aged Mahón ===
Conversely, harder, more aged Mahón should be wrapped in foil or waxed paper.

== Uses ==
- Mahón is considered one of the most versatile cheeses of the Spanish gastronomy.
- The creamy texture suggests it be served over pasta, potato, rice and/or vegetable dishes.
- The traditional manner of eating Mahón consisted of sliced cheese, sprinkled with olive oil, black pepper and tarragon.
- Most of the production of this cheese is used to make processed cheese (queso fundido, not to be confused with the cheese dish of the same name).

== See also ==
- List of cheeses
