= Sobrassada =

Raw, cured sausage in Balearic Islands cuisine

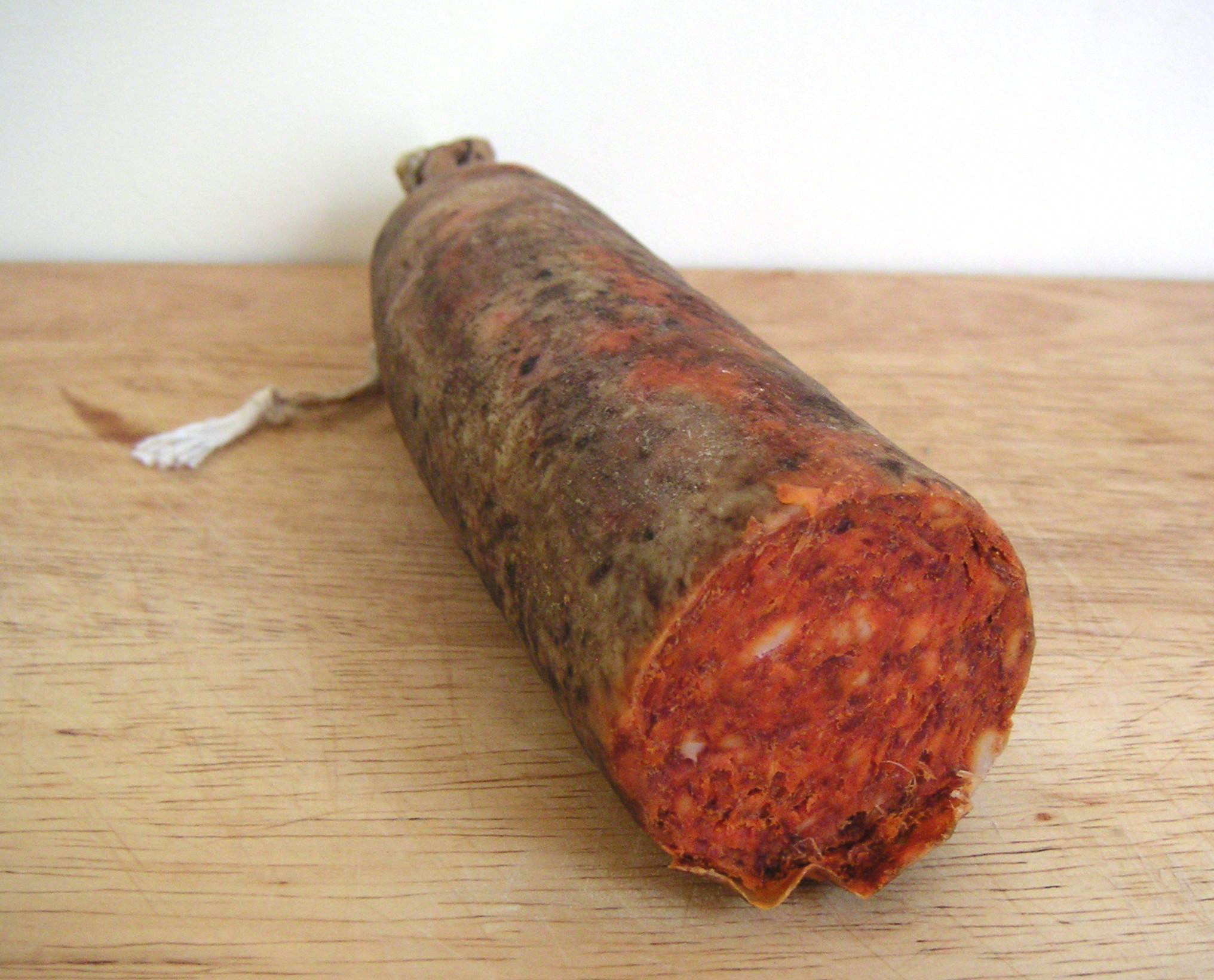
- Home-made Minorcan sobrassada
- Course: Sausage
- Place of origin: Spain
- Region or state: Balearic Islands
- Main ingredients: Pork

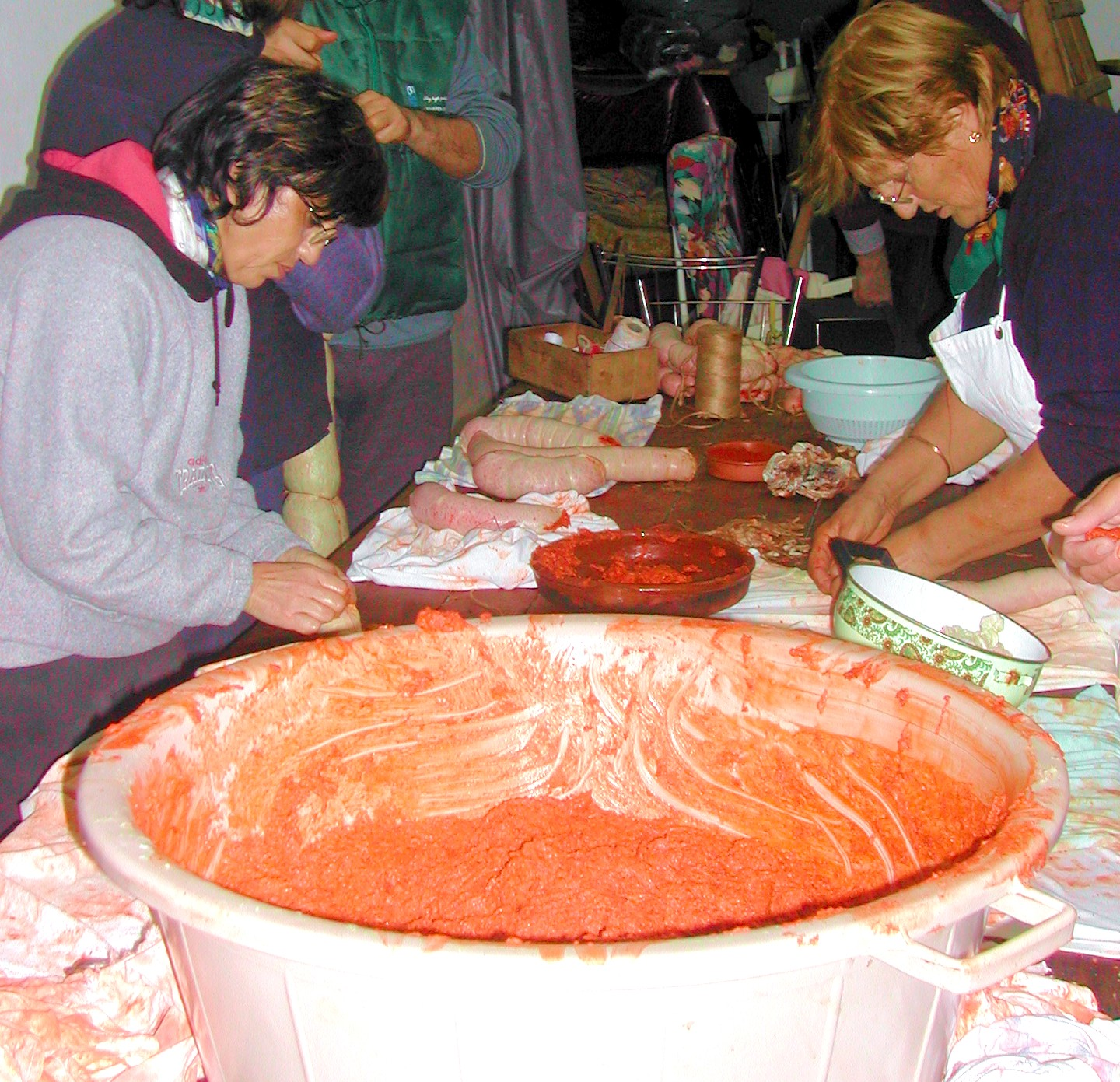
Women sewing sobrassada during the festival of the slaughter of pigs, Son Ferriol, Majorca

Sobrassada in Catalan, or sobrasada in Spanish, is a raw, cured sausage from the Balearic Islands (Spain) made with ground pork, paprika, salt and other spices. Sobrassada, along with botifarró, are traditional Balearic meat products prepared in the laborious but festive rites that still mark the autumn and winter pig slaughter known as a matança in Minorca, Majorca and Ibiza. The chemical principle that makes sobrassada is the dehydration of meat under certain weather conditions (high humidity and mild cold) which are typical of the late Balearic autumn.

== History ==
After centuries of Muslim rule of the Iberian Peninsula, pork consumption returned to the region in the Middle Ages. Paprika was added after the spice was brought back from the Americas in the 15th century. Sobrassada is thought to have originated and expanded, as a culinary concept, in the Crown of Aragon-controlled Western Mediterranean (Sicily, Balearic Islands, Sardinia) after the 14th century, as similar sausages are still made in this region.

In a traditional Mediterranean diet, containing little meat, as Mallorca had until the 1950s, sobrassada and related pork sausages were the main and sometimes only sources of pork for Mallorcans. Larger meat cuts such as pork or lamb roasts, pork steaks or beef cuts were largely festive dishes, or restricted to the well-off. Even today dishes such as porcella rostida, a whole roasted suckling pig, are only served on special occasions.

== Ingredients and varieties ==
Sobrassada is made with a choice of pork loin, pork bacon (locally called xuia), minced and mixed with paprika, salt and black pepper at the ends (to deter insects). Some makers also add cayenne pepper to the mixture and market it as coent, hot. Then the mixture is put into a pork intestine, and hung from a pole for some weeks until it is cured. The string which is tied around the intestine can be used to differentiate between the hot and the dolça (lit. 'sweet', though in this case meaning 'not spicy') varieties, the red or red and white string being the hot one.

Small, thin sobrassades are called llonganissa, and are made from the small intestine. Bigger and thicker ones are called cular or pultrums, and the largest type are huge pork bladders called bufetes or bisbe ('bishop'). Thicker varieties take longer to cure, staggering its consumption through the year (thinner during winter, thicker during summer-autumn).

== Sobrassada outside the Balearic Islands ==
Other areas in the Mediterranean, apart from the Balearic Islands, have close links to sobrassada.

In Catalonia, due to the shared history and culture with the Balearic Islands, sobrassada and other native pork products can be found. The eastern Pyrenees are known for a mountain version of sobrassada.

The village of Tàrbena, in the province of Alicante, was re-populated after the expulsion of the Moriscos with colonists from Majorca, who brought along several traditions from the island, including their own variant of the Catalan language and foods such as sobrassada, still made there.

In colonial Algeria, sobrassada, named soubressade, was part of the Pied-Noir cuisine and extremely popular until the independence and re-Islamisation of the country; pork is forbidden by Islam. Today soubressade can only be found in continental France, in butcher shops run by Pieds-Noirs. Algerians however, enjoy a halal version of the soubressade made with beef instead of pork.

On the island of Sicily and in Calabria, a similar sausage has been made under the name soppressata since the 15th century or longer.

== See also ==
- Soppressata
