= Traditions of Catalonia =

Aspect of Catalan culture

Traditions of Catalonia are sets of traditions, values, customs, and festivities that belongs within the culture of Catalan people. While most are of ancient origin, certain traditions are of relatively recent introduction. There are also some that are common to the whole Catalan society, but others are relevant only to a particular location. Generally, locals welcome outsiders to share with them in their celebration.

== Festivals and celebrations ==
The correfocs, in which "devils" play with fire close to the onlookers, is one of the most striking of the Catalan festive events. The devils are not considered the incarnation of evil; they are sprightly and festive characters, dancing to the sound of drums and the traditional gralla, while they set off their fireworks.

Another tradition occurs during the spring festival day of Sant Jordi (St George's Day, 23 April), in which men give roses (mostly in a deep red color) to women, and women give a book to men as a present. That day is also known as "Dia del Llibre" (Book Day), coinciding with the anniversaries of the deaths of William Shakespeare, Miguel de Cervantes and Josep Pla. The streets are full of people gathering around book and flower stands.

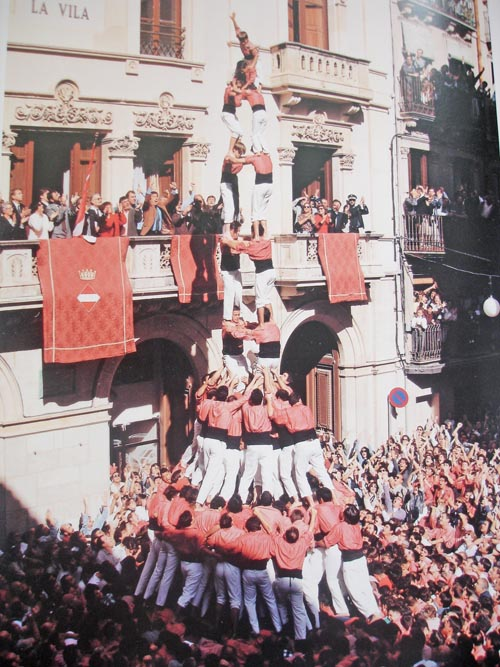
The Castellers

Perhaps the most spectacular of the Catalan festivals are those of the colles castelleres, groups of enthusiasts who form impressive human towers (up to ten people high). This is an old tradition of the Tarragona region, which has now spread to many parts of Catalonia, and has become a real spectacle, or sport, that attracts thousands of people. Amongst other important festivities are the carnivals over all the country, especially in Sitges, Solsona, Tarragona and Vilanova i la Geltrú, and the Patum in Berga.

In Catalonia, there are a few local Christmas traditions; one of them is the popular figure of the Tió de Nadal. Another custom is to put up a "Pessebre" Nativity scene, which often includes the Caganer, a figurine depicted in the act of defecation. It is also traditional to hang small branches of mistletoe (vesc) above the doors.

Traditionally, all Catalan men and women are named after a Christian saint, Virgin or Biblical personality. Besides celebrating birthdays, Catalan people used to celebrate their given name saint's day, according to the General Roman Calendar.

The Catalan "Diada" or National Day of Catalonia is on 11 September, after the defeat and surrender of Barcelona to the French-Castilian army of Philip V of Spain and his supporters during the War of Spanish Succession. Similarly 7 November is also remembered in Northern Catalonia after the Treaty of the Pyrenees.

== Dance and music ==
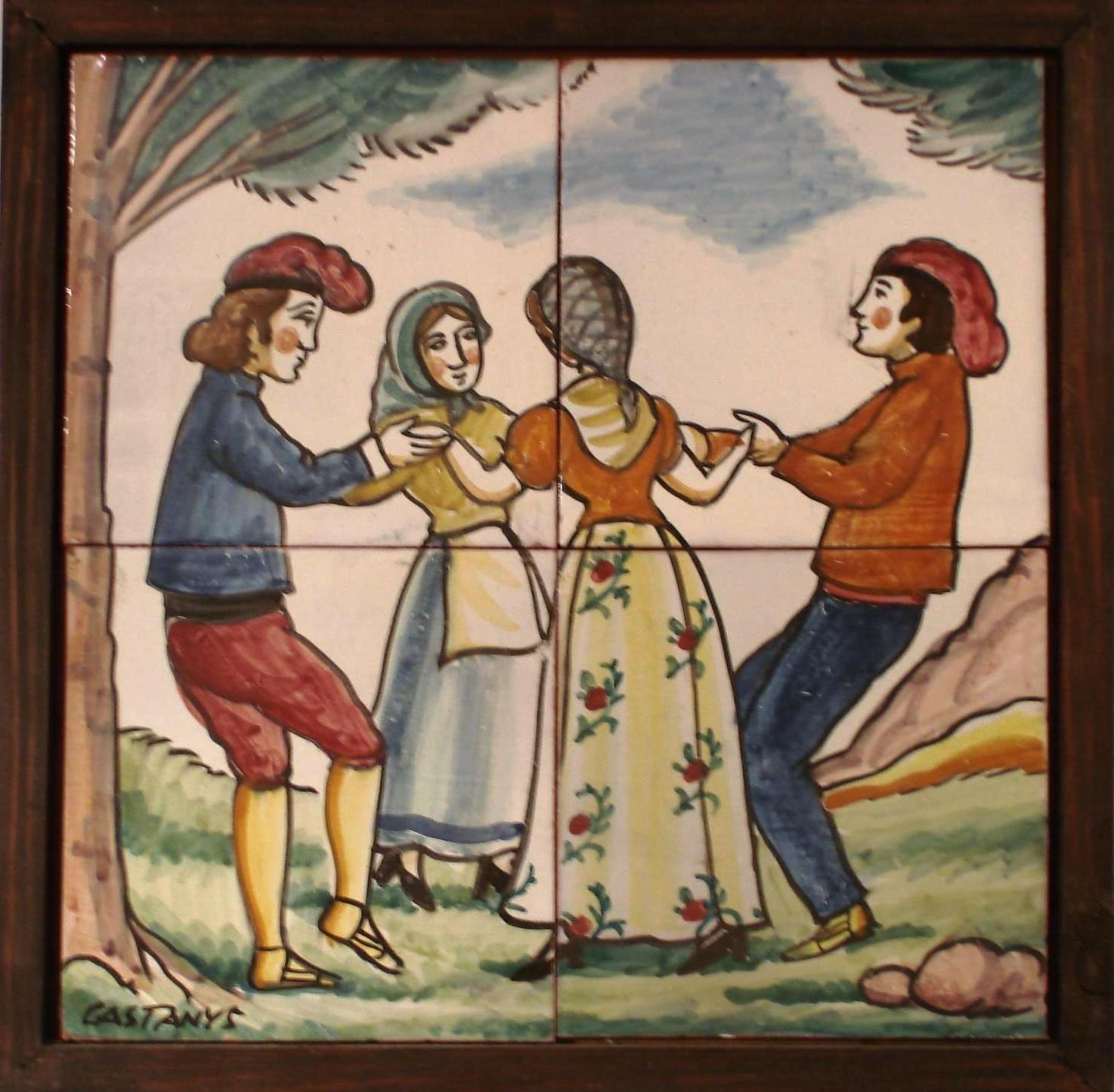
The sardana is a circular.

Among the musical traditions, there is the very special music of the cobles, the wind bands that play sardanes. The sardana is a circular, open dance, that originated in the Empordà region (north of the country by the Mediterranean sea) and the Pyrenees (Catalan Pirineus), and is now danced in many squares and streets all over Catalonia.

Popular folk songs include El Rossinyol, La Balanguera, La Santa Espina, Virolai and El Cant dels Ocells. Some of them became something like unofficial national anthems under the years of General Franco's dictatorship. Some of those songs became popular all over the world with the success of the Orfeó Català choir around the beginning of the 20th century. Another song, created by the present singer Lluís Llach, L'Estaca, also gained sudden recognition as expressing the national feeling of Catalans. Despite its relatively recent introduction, singing L'Estaca became a kind of tradition.

Another important Catalan musical tradition is the singing of havaneres and burning rhum together at the cremat which often happen simultaneously.

== Culinary traditions ==
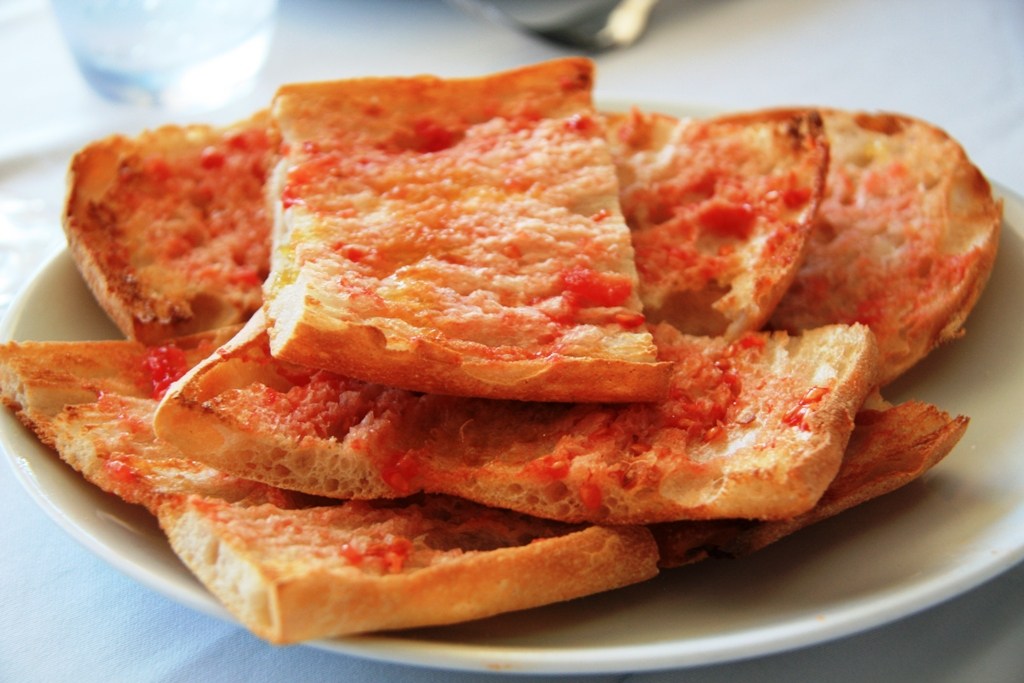
The pa amb tomàquet.

There are a number of Catalan culinary traditions, some of them coincide with a religious festival, like cooking a big Christmas Day meal on 25 December which includes escudella i carn d'olla. Saint Stephen's Day on 26 December is a holiday in Catalonia. It is celebrated right after Christmas, with another big meal including canelons stuffed with the ground remaining meat of the previous day. These events are usually celebrated along with kin and close friends.

Other religious event related foods include the Panellets sweets eaten on All Saints' Day and the Bunyols de Quaresma puffy little buns eaten to celebrate Lent.

One of the most representative Catalan gastronomy-centered events is the Calçotada. This is a group event where a certain type of tender onions (calçots) are barbecued outdoors, among much feasting and merrymaking with family and friends.

Similar occasions may be the Costellada and the Botifarrada, where mutton ribs or botifarra sausages are barbecued. Sometimes people also get together to roast pine kernels or chestnuts; the latter is known as "Castanyada", and it is a favoured event in the fall.

The Vermut is a tradition, of having a light aperitif with olives and potato chips before the Sunday meal (formerly after going to church) together with family and friends.

An important tradition in rural areas of Catalonia is the pig slaughter (Matança del porc). Although it has declined in importance owing to strict sanitary European Community rules and public sensitivities, it is still celebrated in certain villages, like La Cellera de Ter, Artesa de Segre, Vall-de-roures, Passanant and La Llacuna.

== Other events ==
Mushroom hunting is a popular activity in Catalonia, where a mushroom hunter is called boletaire. There is a tradition of going to hunt mushrooms as a family or group in the fall, after the rains marking the end of the summer season.

In Catalonia, sport often has a strong national and political connotation. The Barça football team and the USAP Perpignan rugby team are often considered, especially by Catalan pro-independence individuals and organizations, to act as unofficial national teams of Catalonia.

== Holidays and festivities in Catalonia ==
Date	Official name	Indigenous name	Remarks
1 January	New Year's Day	Any nou	Celebrates beginning of the Gregorian calendar year. Festivities include counting down to midnight (12:00 am) on the preceding night, New Year's Eve.
5 January	Epiphany	Dia de Reis	There is a long tradition for having the children receive their Christmas presents by the "Three King" (Tres Reis) during the night of 5 January (Biblical Magi Eve). On this day, people usually eat a special cake called Tortell de reis.
March or April	Good Friday	Divendres Sant	In many cities of Catalonia, processions with statues representing the Passion of Christ are held.
March or April	Easter	Pasqua	Celebration of the Resurrection of Jesus Christ from the dead on the third day after his crucifixion. Children traditionally receive a mona (a traditional Easter cake) from their Godparent.
March or April	Easter Monday	Dilluns de Pasqua	Second day of the octave of Easter.
23 April	St George's Day	Diada de Sant Jordi	Saint George (Sant Jordi) is the patron saint of Catalonia. It is traditional to give a rose and a book to a loved one.
27 April	Virgin of Montserrat's Day	Mare de Déu de Montserrat	Virgin of Montserrat (la Moreneta) is the patroness of Catalonia.
1 May	Labour Day	Dia dels Treballadors	National holiday to celebrate the economic and social achievements of workers.
23 June	Midsummer	Revetlla de Sant Joan	Celebration in honour of St. John the Baptist and takes place in the evening of 23 June. Parties are organised usually at beaches, where bonfires are lit and a set of firework displays usually take place. Special foods such as Coca de Sant Joan are also served on this occasion.
24 June	St. John's Day	Dia de Sant Joan	Christian feast day celebrating the birth of Jesus’ likely cousin, Saint John the Baptist. This is considered to be the national day of the Catalan Countries.
11 September	National Day of Catalonia	Diada Nacional de Catalunya	Catalonia commemorates the 1714 Siege of Barcelona defeat during the War of the Spanish Succession. Throughout the day, there are political demonstrations, concerts and celebration events. Many citizens wave either senyeres.
1 November	All Saints Day	Tots Sants	It is a solemnity to honour and remember the relatives and loved ones who had died. Panellets are the traditional dessert on this holiday.
25 December	Christmas	Nadal	Celebrates the birth of Jesus. The Tio de Nadal is a part of the celebrations.
26 December	Saint Stephen's Day	Sant Esteve	It is celebrated right after Christmas, with a big meal including canelons. These are stuffed with the ground remaining meat from the escudella i carn d'olla, turkey or capó of the previous day.
31 December	New Year's Eve	Cap d'Any	Final Day of the Gregorian year. Usually accompanied by much celebration.

== Images of traditional celebrations ==
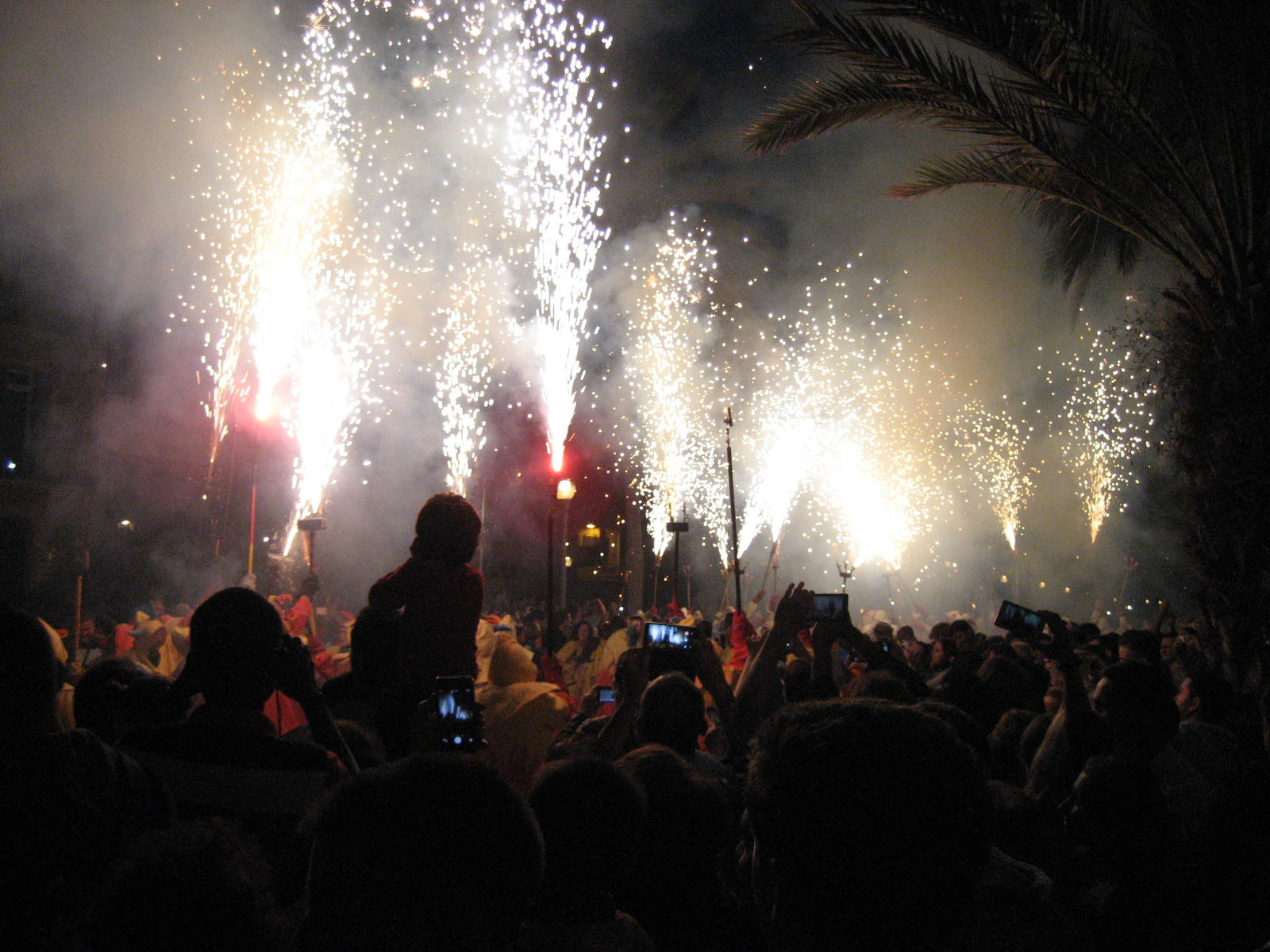
Correfocs in Badalona.

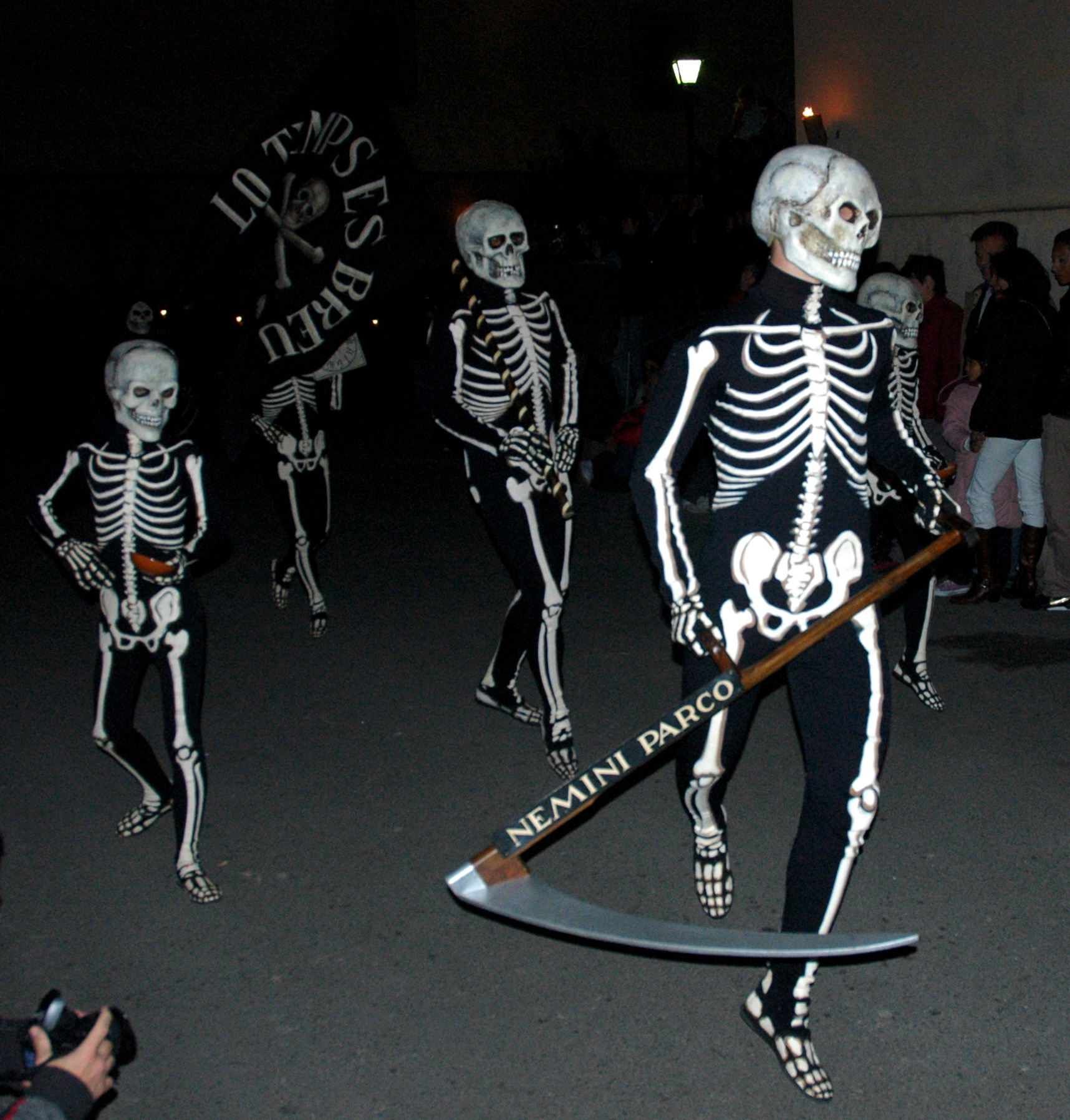
Dansa de la Mort, at Verges (Baix Empordà).

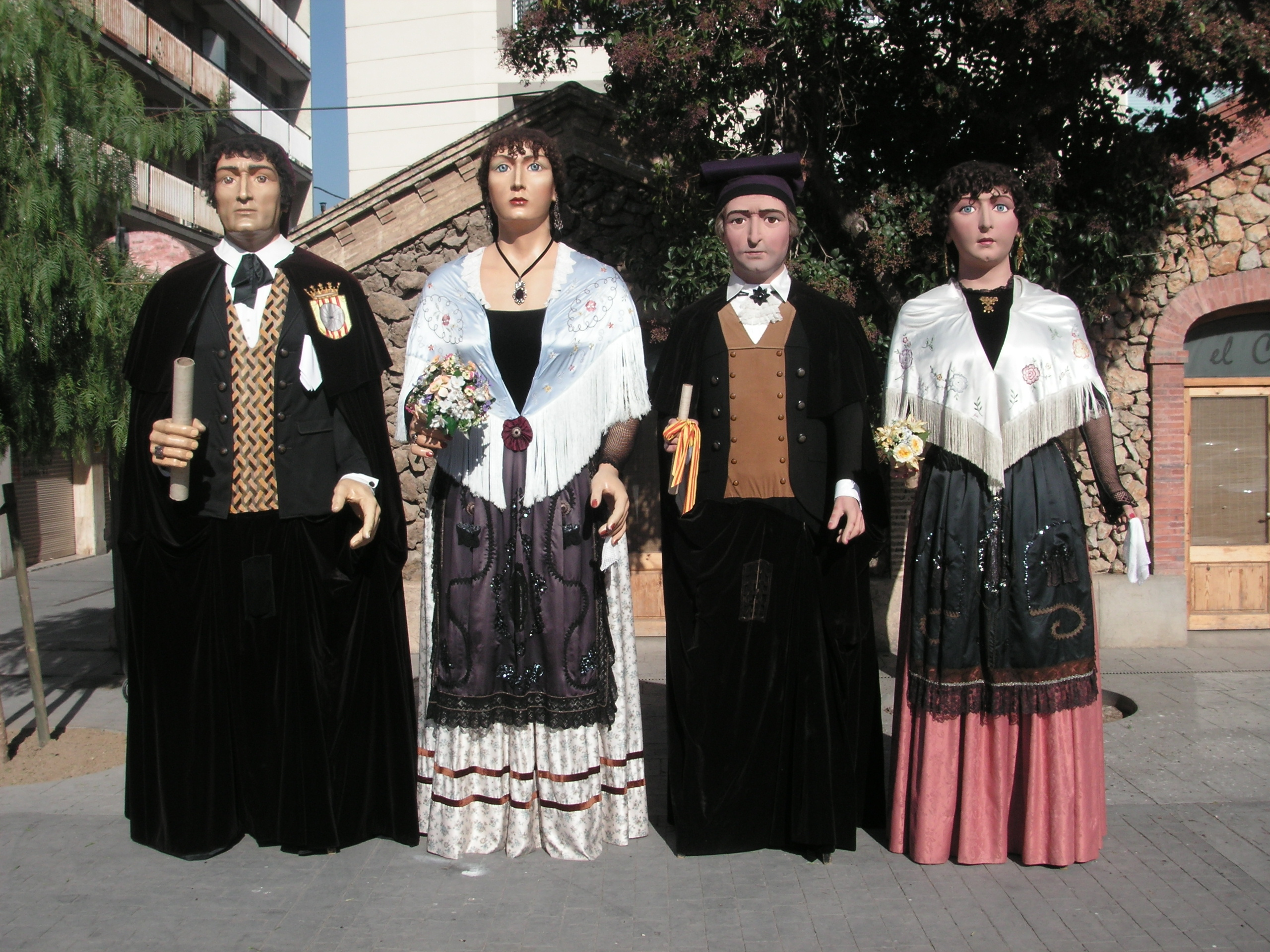
Gegants at Molins de Rei. The female figures are dressed as a pubilla.

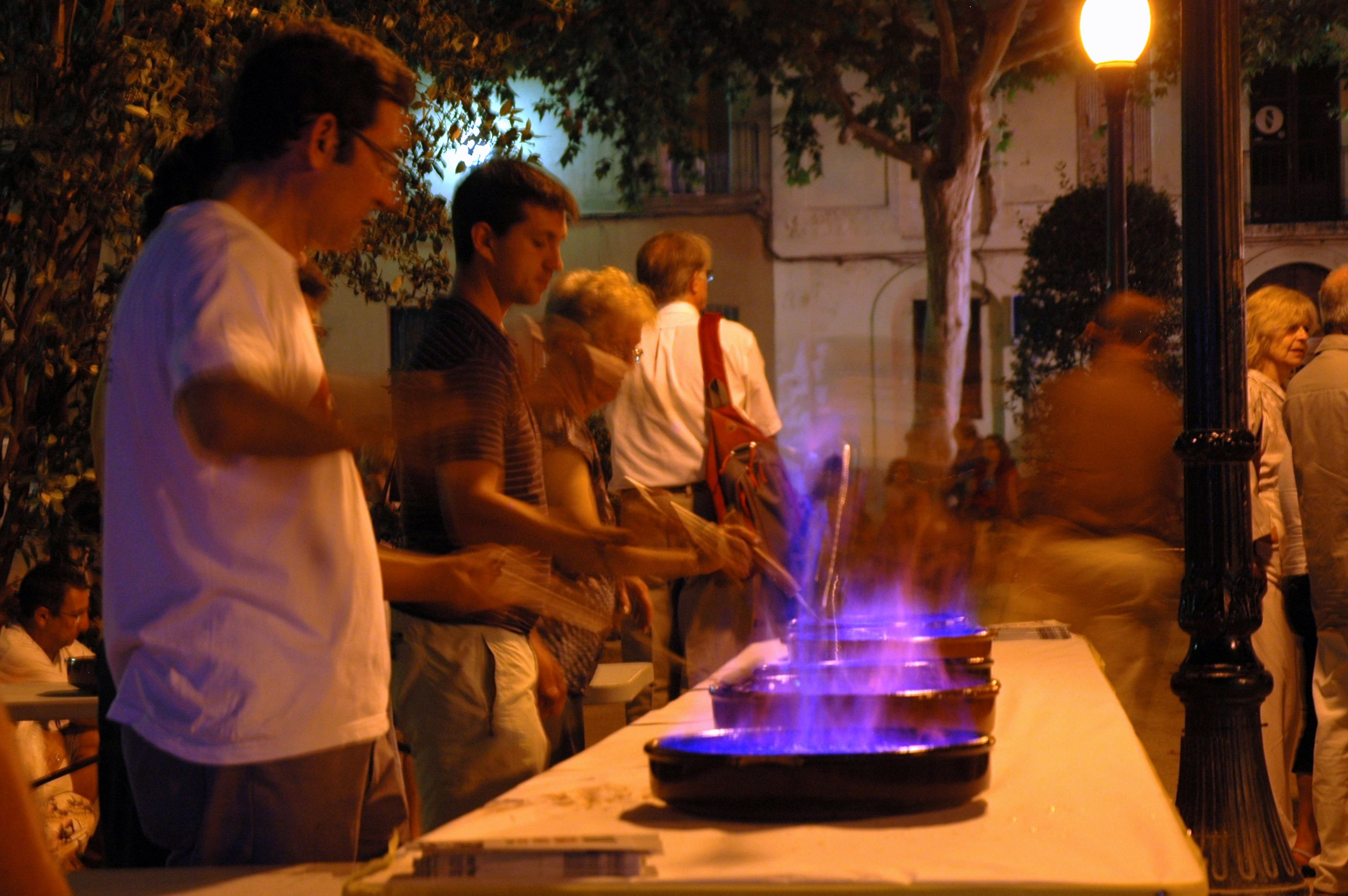
Flames during the Cremat.

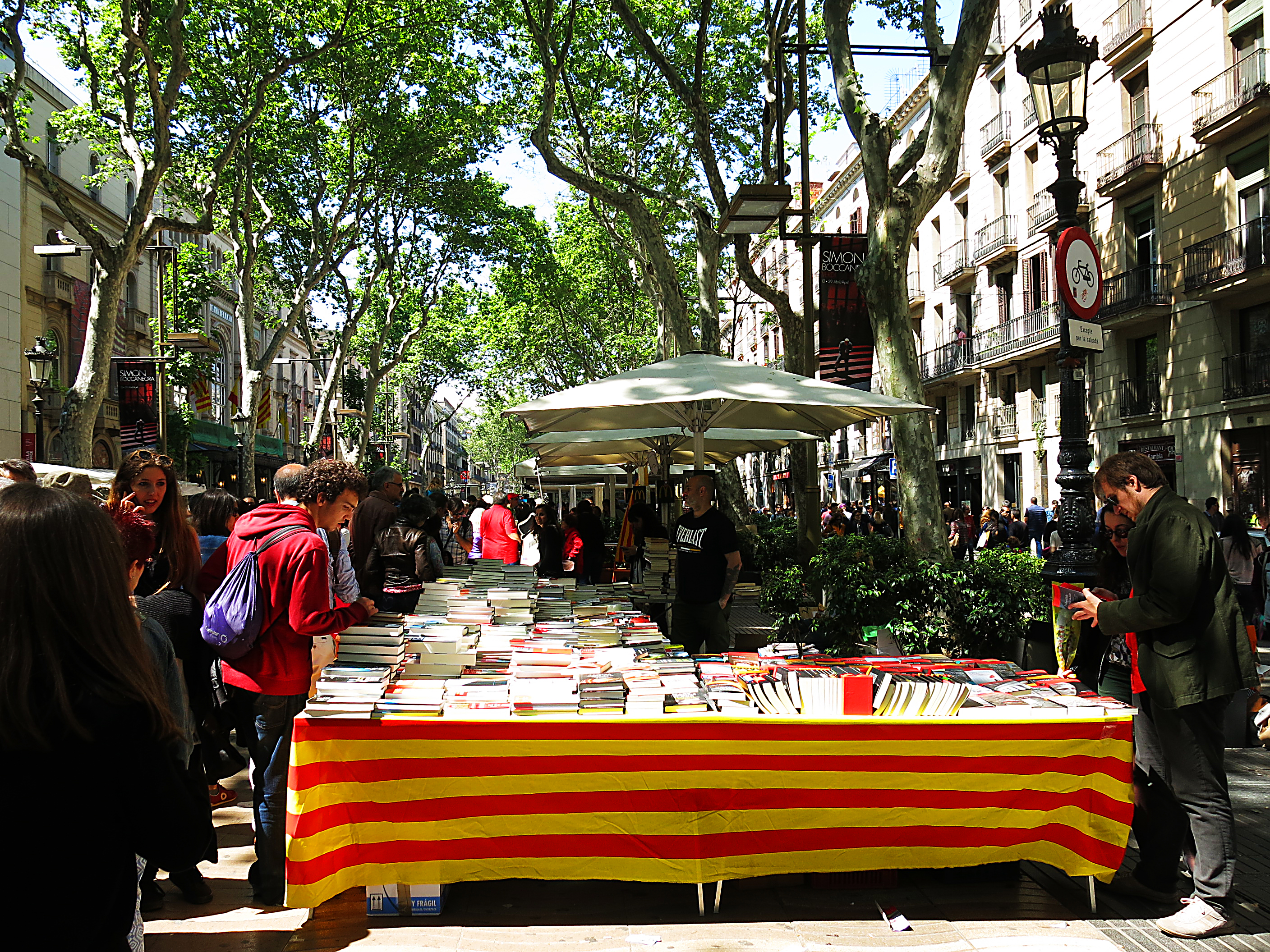
Diada de Sant Jordi (Saint George's Day) in Barcelona.

== See also ==
- Auca (cartoon)
- National symbols of Catalonia
