= Pubilla =

Female heir in ancient Catalonia

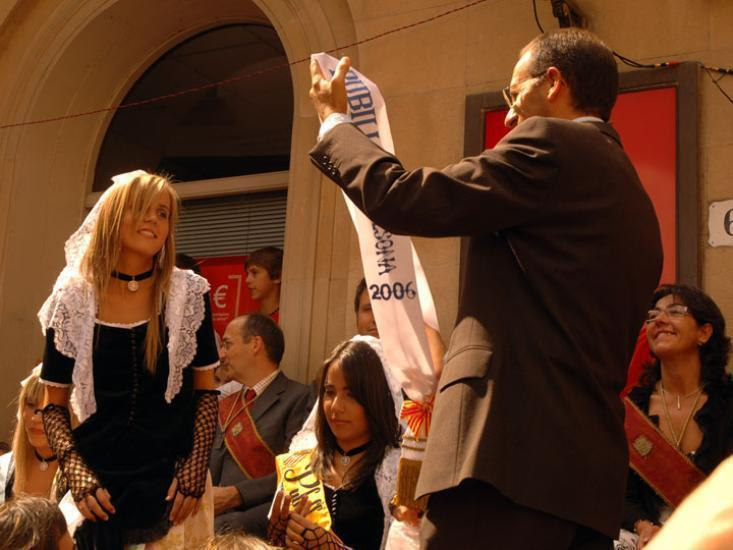
Formal naming of a pubilla during a ceremony in Solsona

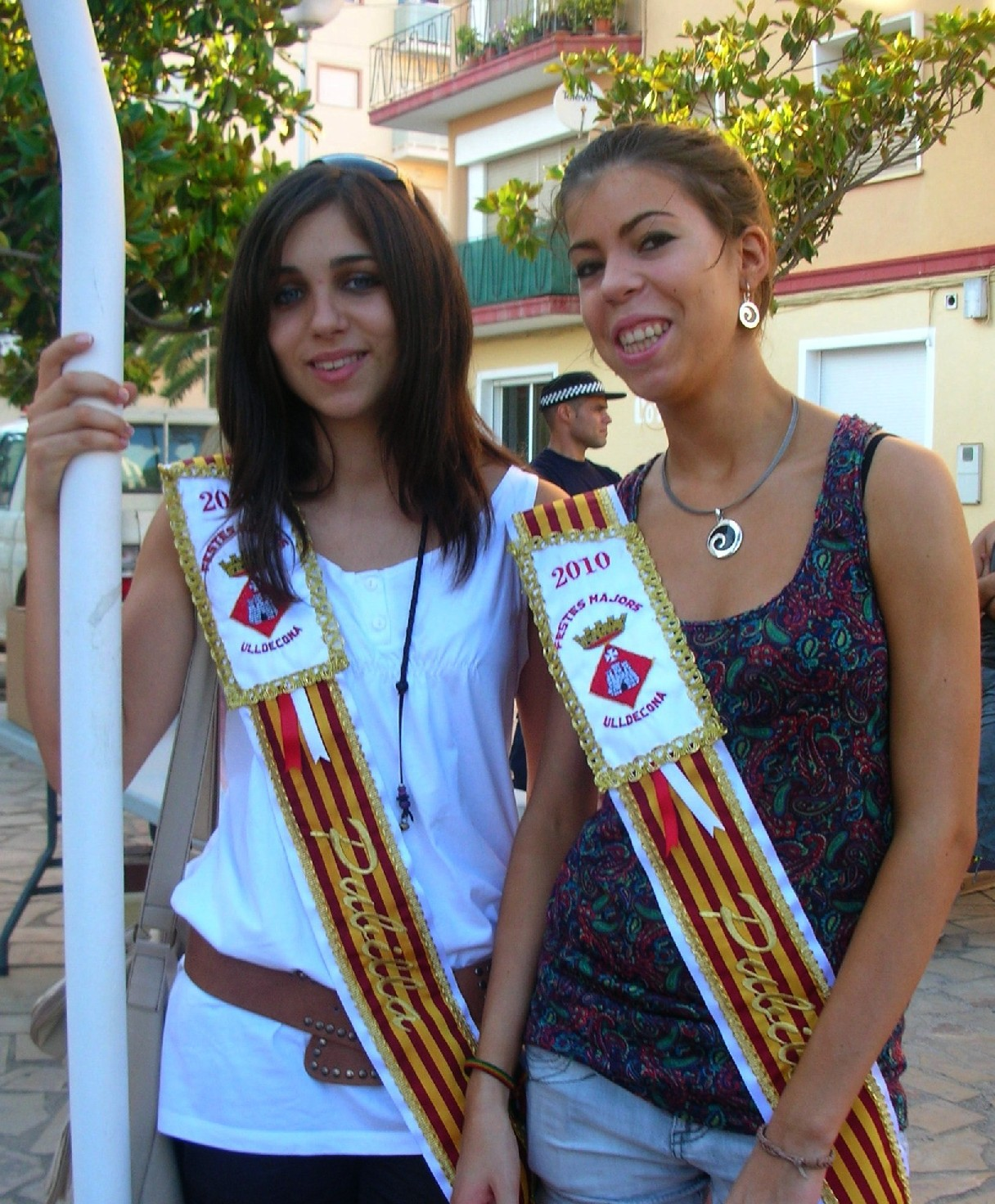
Pubilles in Ulldecona.

A pubilla (Catalan pronunciation: [puˈβiʎə]; plural pubilles) in ancestral Catalan tradition was the female that would inherit the whole rural estate in the absence of a brother.

== Tradition ==
She was the female version of the hereu or male heir of the whole property of the family. Traditionally, when a couple had no son, the eldest girl of the family would inherit the home and the estate in ancient Catalonia. The purpose was to not divide estates that were already too small to exploit in a profitable manner.

From mid 20th century onwards the image of the pubilla underwent a change; in present times the pubilla has a role similar to a local beauty queen in local popular celebrations. Sometimes the female gegants are dressed as a pubilla, like in Manresa. Often the naming of a pubilla is a good occasion for a Catalan girl to dress in the traditional costume.

== See also ==
- Traditions of Catalonia
- Symbols of Catalonia
- Ciutat Pubilla de la Sardana

== Literature ==
- Kathryn A. Woolard, Double talk: bilingualism and the politics of ethnicity in Catalonia, Stanford University Press (1989), ISBN 978-0-8047-1502-7
