= National symbols of Catalonia =

The national symbols of Catalonia are objects, icons or cultural expressions that are emblematic, representative or otherwise characteristic of Catalonia or Catalan culture.

The oldest Catalan symbol is the coat of arms of Catalonia, which was the royal arms of the Crown of Aragon, though a number of theories trace its origin to even older times. It is one of the oldest coats of arms in Europe. Owing to a common history and shared experiences, some of the traditional Catalan symbols overlap with those of Aragon, Valencia and the Balearic Islands. This is often cause of controversies regarding differing perceptions of the culture, the history and the language issues surrounding the former Crown of Aragon and the culturally Catalan lands.

Catalonia's national symbols as defined in the Statute of Autonomy of Catalonia are the flag, Catalonia's day, and the anthem. These symbols have often a political and revindicative significance. Other symbols may not have official status, for different reasons, but are likewise recognised at a national or international level.

== Official national symbols ==
Image	Name	Description	Officially adopted
The flag of Catalonia	Flag of Catalonia or Senyera	The flag of Catalonia or Senyera (its name in Catalan), based on the coat of arms, is the most representative official symbol. It consists of four red stripes on a golden background. Its use dates from the 12th century, when it was the symbol of the kings of Aragon and counts of Barcelona. Proportions of the flag are 2:3.	May 25, 1933
National Day of Catalonia, 2005	National Day of Catalonia	The National Day of Catalonia, commonly called La Diada is on 11 September. It commemorates the 1714 Siege of Barcelona defeat during the War of the Spanish Succession.	June 12, 1980
	National anthem, Els Segadors	"Els Segadors" (The Reapers) is the national anthem of Catalonia. Is an adaptation of a popular song of the 18th century based on the Reapers' War (1640-1659). It has been an unofficial Catalan anthem since the late 19th century, and officially recognized by law in 1993.	January 19, 1993

== Historical ==
The coat of arms of Catalonia. It appeared for the first time in a seal of Ramon Berenguer IV, Count of Barcelona and Prince of Aragon. While remaining the personal emblem of the kings of Aragon, from the late 14th century onwards it began to be territorialized, particularly on the Principality of Catalonia.
The Constitutions of Catalonia (Constitucions de Catalunya) were the legislation of the Principality of Catalonia promulgated by the monarch as Count of Barcelona and passed by the Catalan Courts. The first ones were promulgated in 1283, the last ones in 1706. They had pre-eminence over the other legal rules and could only be revoked by the Courts themselves. Those of public law were suspended by the Nueva Planta Decree of 1716, however, the ones of private law survived, being codified and modernized in the Civil Code of Catalonia, one of the main differential elements of Catalan society.
The General Court of Catalonia (Cort General de Catalunya) were the parliamentary body of the Principality of Catalonia from the 13th to the 18th century. Composed by the king and the three estates of the realm, the Courts was a regulatory body, as their decisions had the force of law, being the first parliament of Europe to officially obtain the power to pass legislation. The institution is regarded as the cornestone of Catalan parliamentary tradition.
Palau de la Generalitat is a historic building located in Barcelona. It hosted the government and the presidency of the Generalitat, the institution of self-government of Catalonia, representing the Catalan historical continuity and the democratic values of modern Catalonia.
The Poblet Abbey is a Cistercian monastery, founded in 1151, located at the foot of the Prades Mountains, in the comarca of Conca de Barberà, Tarragona, where the ancient kings of the Crown of Aragon lie buried. Part of the "Cistercian triangle" that helped consolidate power in Catalonia in the 12th century.
The sickle is an agricultural tool particularly associated with the Reapers' War (1640-1652) and other Catalan popular uprisings. It is a well-known symbol among the left-wing branch of Catalan independence movement.

== Cultural and popular symbols ==
Catalan language.
A Castell (lit. "Castle") is a human tower built traditionally at festivals in most of Catalonia. At these festivals, several colles castelleres (local teams) attempt to build and then dismantle a tower's structure. The assembly of a castell is complete once all castellers have climbed into their designated places, and the enxaneta (a kid) climbs into place at the top and raises one open hand.
The Sardana, considered as the national dance.
Catalan children wearing the traditional outfit, including the red barretina.
Saint George's Day (23 April) is a popular annual festival dedicated to the patron saint of Catalonia. It is regarded as one of Catalan national holidays and the most important day of the Catalan culture. Books and roses are exchanged, particularly between sweethearts and loved ones, therefore, the festival serves the same romantic purposes that of Saint Valentine's Day in Anglophone countries.
Correfoc is a pyrotechnic show typical of festivals throughout the Catalan Countries. A group of individuals will dress as devils and light up fireworks – fixed on devil's pitchforks. Dancing to the sound of a rhythmic drum group, they set off their fireworks among crowds of spectators. The spectators that participate attempt to get as close as possible to the devils.
The Flame of Canigó (Flama del Canigó) is a tradition linked to Midsummer that takes place between June 22 and 23. It begins with the renewal of the fire at the top of Canigó peak (Northern Catalonia, France) during the evening and culminates with the lighting of the bonfires on the Saint John's Eve with the flame carried by volunteers through all of the Catalan Countries.
Tió de Nadal.
Caganer is a figurine depicted in the act of defecation appearing in nativity scenes in Catalonia. The name "Caganer" literally means "pooper". Traditionally, the figurine is depicted as a peasant, wearing the traditional barretina and with his trousers down, showing a bare backside, and defecating.
One of the most famous international symbols of Catalonia is FC Barcelona. The area's footballing branch is supported with a passion by its fans, the culés. Each season Barça engages in one of La Liga's most famous rivalries, El Clàssic against long-time rivals Real Madrid.
USA Perpignan.

== Historical figures ==
=== Politics ===
Wilfred the Hairy, Count of Barcelona and other Catalan counties (878–897), founder of the House of Barcelona. A legend says that the four red bars (Quatre Barres) are the result of Charles the Bald, king of West Francia, smearing four bloodied fingers over Wilfred the Hairy's golden shield, after the latter had fought against the Normans. He is also known as the Pare de la Pàtria ("Father of the Country").
Ermesinde of Carcassonne (975/8–1058), was countess of Barcelona, Girona and Osona by marriage to Ramon Borrell, Count of Barcelona. She served as regent during the minority of her son Berenguer Ramon and her grandson Ramon Berenguer I. Ermesinde represented the last resistance to the process of feudalization of the Catalan counties and she is regarded as one of the most powerful women of the history of Catalonia.
James I the Conqueror was King of Aragon and Count of Barcelona from 1213 to 1276, member of the House of Barcelona. His reign saw the conquest of the Balearic Islands and Valencia, thus dramatically expanding the Catalan-speaking area.
Rafael Casanova.
Francesc Macià.
Lluís Companys, president of the Generalitat of Catalonia (1934-1940). He had a key role in the proclamation of the Second Spanish Republic. As president, Companys tried to implement a progressive agenda, despite the difficulties. During the Spanish Civil War he remained loyal to the Republic. Being arrested in France by the Gestapo, he was extradited back to Francoist Spain and executed on 15 October 1940. He is known as the "President màrtir".

=== Literature ===
Àngel Guimerà (1845/9-1924)
Jacint Verdaguer (1845-1902), considered as the national poet of Catalonia.
The novelist Mercè Rodoreda (1908-1983) is considered the most iconic and influential contemporary Catalan language writer. Her novel La Plaça del Diamant (The diamond square, translated in the English speaking world as "The Time of the Doves") has become the most popular Catalan novel to date and has been translated into over 30 languages.
Maria Mercè Marçal (1952 – 1998)

=== Art and architecture ===
Antoni Gaudí.
Joan Miró.
Salvador Dalí.

=== Various ===
Joan Sala i Ferrer, also known as Serrallonga.
Timbaler del Bruc (Drummer of El Bruc) is a Catalan legendary character who played the drums during the battle of El Bruc, the sound of which, echoing in Montserrat mountain, convinced the French that the number of their enemy was much larger than it really was. Commemorates the resistance against Napoleon I's troops in Catalonia during the Peninsular War (1808-1814).
Narcís Monturiol.
Johan Cruijff.

== Religious ==
The Virgin of Montserrat.
Sant Jordi (Saint George), the patron saint of Catalonia.
Sagrada Família.
The fresco of the Apse of Sant Climent de Taüll is one of the masterpieces of the European Romanesque. It was painted in the early 12th century in the church of Sant Climent de Taüll in Vall de Boí, Alta Ribagorça in the Catalan Pyrenees.
The seny is a kind of good sense and wisdom. It involves well-pondered perception of situations, awareness, and right action. According writer and bishop Josep Torras i Bages it was based in ancient Catalan traditions. The opposite of seny is known as rauxa, and the co-existence or the predominance of one or another is traditionally seen as paradigmatic of the history of Catalan people.

== Geographic ==
Montserrat is an iconic multi-peaked mountain range near Barcelona. The mountain is composed of strikingly pink conglomerate, a form of sedimentary rock. It is site of the Benedictine abbey, Santa Maria de Montserrat, which hosts the Virgin of Montserrat.
The Canigó is a mountain located in the comarques of Vallespir and Conflent, Northern Catalonia (France), being also visible from Southern Catalonia, it has a historical symbolical significance for Catalan people. On 23 June, the night before St. John's day, there is a ceremony called Flama del Canigó. People carry a flaming torch to the top of the mountain, and people light bonfires from the Flame throughout the Catalan Countries.
Pedraforca is an emblematic striking double-peaked mountain in the Pre-Pyrenees, located in the comarca of Berguedà and endowed with mythical attributes according to the local folklore. Its fame has made Pedraforca a popular destination for hikers and rock climbers.
Costa Brava.
Salses is a town located in Northern Catalonia (Pyrénées-Orientales, France), traditionally considered as the northernmost point of the Catalan Countries. The other three extreme points are Guardamar (Valencia), the southernmost, Mahón (Menorca), the easternmost, and Fraga (La Franja, Aragon), the westernmost.

== Gastronomy ==
Pa amb tomàquet (bread with tomato) is considered the quintessential dish of Catalonia. It consists of toasted bread with tomato rubbed over and seasoned with olive oil and salt.
The Calçot is a type of scallion or green onion. A "calçotada" is an annual event in Tarragona celebrating the harvest of Calçot. It is grilled on high fire and eaten after peeling with bare hands by dipping one by one in romesco sauce along with an accompaniment of red wine and bread.
A botifarra is a sausage made from the large intestine of a pig filled with minced and marinated meat from the same animal, seasoned with salt and pepper. Botifarra amb mongetes ("botifarra with beans") is perhaps one of the most representative Catalan dish.
Escudella i carn d'olla is a traditional meat and vegetable stew and soup. It is characterized by the use of a pilota, a big meatball spiced with garlic and parsley; it also contains vegetables as celery, cabbage, carrots, etc. and, additionally, bones, botifarra, and other types of meat. In Christmas it included a snail-shaped pasta known as galet.
Crema catalana ("Catalan cream") is a dessert similar to a French crème brûlée. It is made from egg yolks, milk, sugar, cornflour (in modern recipes), and aromatics, typically lemon zest, cinnamon, or vanilla, with a crisp caramel crust.
Cava is an iconic sparkling wine mainly produced in the Penedès region. It may be white (blanc) or rosé (rosat).
Porró is a traditional glass wine pitcher, originating in Catalonia. It allows everyone to drink from the same utensil without touching it with their lips. It fosters communal drinking accompanying food. Porrons are most commonly filled with wine.

== Flora and fauna ==
The "ruc català" or "ase català" (Catalan donkey) is a breed of large domestic donkeys from Catalonia and the Roussillon. As the national animal, is a relatively recent creation when the need was felt to produce something Catalan to oppose to the Central Spanish Osborne bull, widely perceived by many Catalans as a centralistic symbol.
Víbria ("wyvern") is a mythical dragon with two legs, chiropteran wings, sometimes with marked feminine characters (like two prominent breasts) and bird-like, like an eagle's beak with claws and wings. The kings of the Crown of Aragon used it in their personal heraldry as crest. Today, it is frequently represented at traditional local Catalan festivals.
The Phoenix is a mythical creature particularly related with the Renaixença, the 19th century Romantic revivalist movement of the Catalan language and culture.
The Catalan Sheepdog (Catalan: Gos d'atura català) is a breed of Catalan Pyrenean dog used as a sheepdog.
The yellow weaver's broom (ginesta in Catalan) has often been regarded as the national flower of Catalonia, specially in combination with red poppies.
The Pi de les Tres Branques is an individual pine tree located in the municipality of Castellar del Riu. Since the late 19th century it has been seen as a symbol of the unity of the three Catalan Countries and been a venue for political and cultural gatherings.

== See also ==
- Auca (cartoon)
