= Yule log =

Log burnt on a hearth as a Christmas tradition

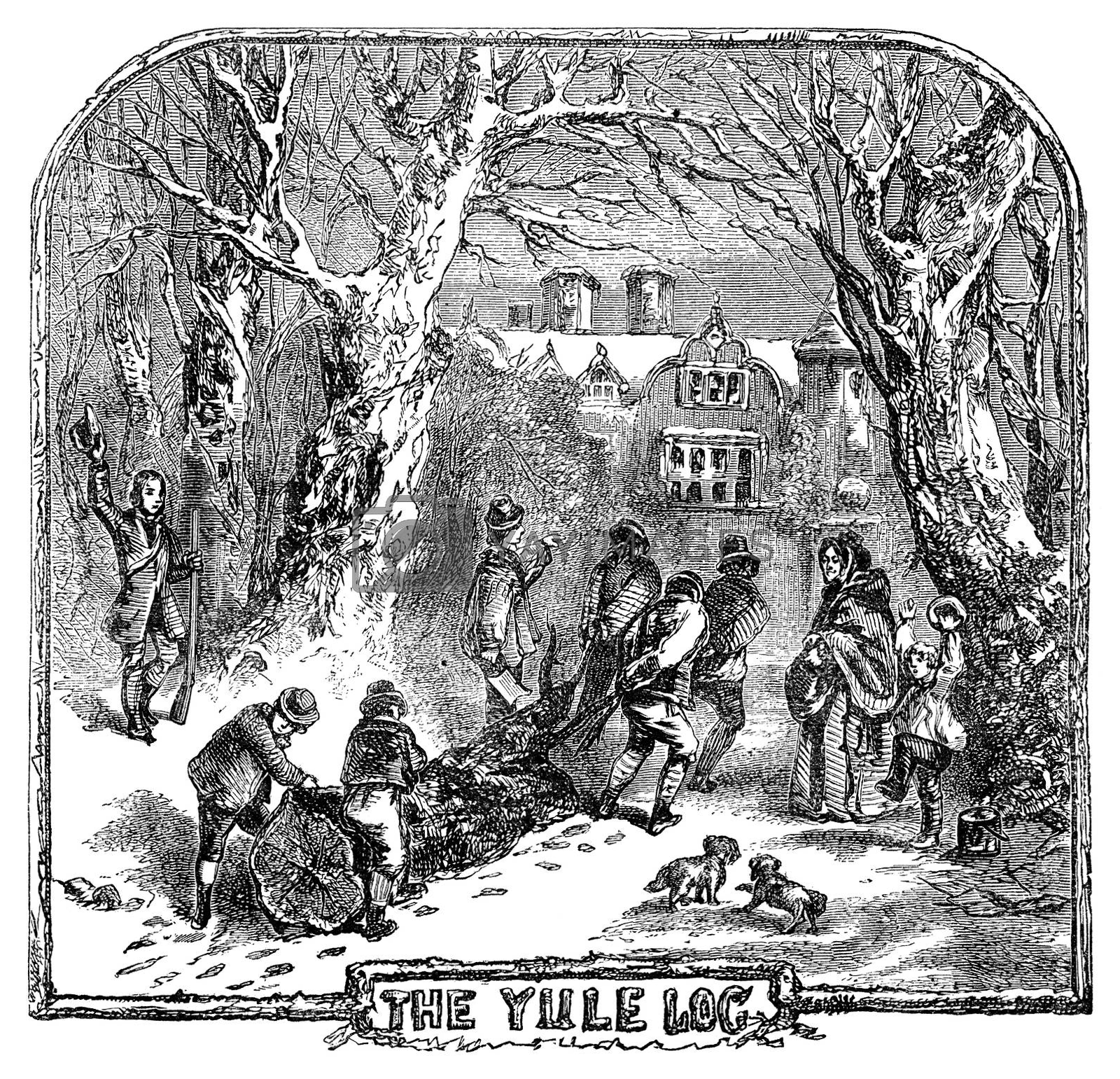
An illustration of people collecting a Yule log from Chambers Book of Days (1832)

The Yule log is a specially selected log burnt on a hearth as a winter tradition in regions of Europe, and subsequently North America. Today, this tradition is celebrated by Christians and modern pagans on or around Christmas or Yule. The name by which this tradition goes, as well as when and how the Yule log should be burnt, varies widely with time and place. The first solid evidence for this tradition originates in 1184 AD as a Christmas eve tradition. The practice was originally known as the "Christmas log" (and still is in languages other than English), with "Yule log" first used in the late 17th century. The origins of the Yule log are unclear, with scholars proposing a variety of possible theories ranging from a medieval Christmas tradition, a surviving ritual from Albanian, Roman, Celtic, Germanic, Baltic or Slavic paganism, or as a Proto-Indo-European ritual that has survived in a variety of cultures until today.

Folklorist Linda Watts provides the following overview of the English Yule log custom:

The Christmas practice calls for burning a portion of the log each evening until Twelfth Night (January 6). The log is subsequently placed beneath the bed for luck, and particularly for protection from the household threats of lightning and, with some irony, fire. Many have beliefs based on the Yule log as it burns, and by counting the sparks and such, they seek to discern their fortunes for the new year and beyond.

== Origins ==
The first evidence in English language sources for a special log burned around Christmas comes from Robert Herrick's poetry collection of 1648, where it is called a "Christmas log". Herrick recounts how cheering lads brought the Christmas log into the farmhouse, are then rewarded with alcohol for their efforts, and how the log was believed to bring prosperity. The first mention of the name Yule log occurs between 1650 and 1687 in John Aubrey's writings on Christmas pastimes when he mentions "a large Yule log or Christmas block". Beginning in the 18th century, it began to be theorized that the custom may have much earlier origins, extending from customs observed in Germanic paganism. In 1725, Henry Bourne was the first scholar to link the Yule log to a prechristian origin, with his suggestion that it originated from Anglo-Saxon paganism.

Since Bourne introduced his theory, there has been significant scholarly debate about whether the connection between the pagan festival of Yule and the Yule log extends beyond the linguistic use of "Yule" as a synonym for Christmas. One of the reasons is that little can be said for certain about the practices of the original Yule celebration. Our most complete descriptions of the customs around the celebration of the festival of Yule come from the Icelandic saga writer Snorri Sturluson. Snorri Sturluson was a 13th century Christian writer, writing more than two centuries after the Christian conversion of Iceland, and was writing for a Christian audience. The degree to which Snorri and other saga writers were aware of the customs of Yule, and the degree to which they cared to accurately represent them in their writings, is currently unknown. In addition, the sagas, our only ancient or medieval sources that mention fire in relation to ancient Yule celebrations, only mention fire when talking about the large fires traditionally found in the center of feasting halls/temples, which were also use year round for heating/cooking. The sagas do not mention any special importance placed of the log's themselves that are being burnt.

The first mention of a special Christmas log comes from a German manuscript of legal obligations written in 1184 CE where it records that the manse of Ahlen is entitled to a whole tree for a private festive fire on Christmas eve. Another early reference can be found in the text Liber statutorum civitatis Ragusii compositus anno, which was written in Dubrovnik in 1272 CE. It records that shipmasters and the sailors brought the count of the city a large log on Christmas eve and place it on the fire, for which they are given as reward two gold coins and alcohol. In Europe during the high to late medieval period and early modern period, lumber and firewood could not be freely collected as nearly all forests and trees were privately owned, mostly by royals, nobles and the church. For a person to get access to the lumber in the forests that they did not own, they had to either buy it or be given rights to a certain amount of wood through a legal charter. Landowners often had contracts with their tenants that laid out exactly how much wood could be collected from the forest for their use for firewood, tools, and building materials, as well as the penalties if they were caught taking more. Stories and legal charters from the 13th/14th century illustrate that it was not uncommon for peasants to be without enough firewood for anything beyond a very small cooking fire on Christmas. In medieval Europe, the burning of a large log on Christmas eve may have been a way to celebrate the end to the period of fasting and contemplation that lasted from the start of advent through Christmas eve, and to celebrate the coming public and private feasts and celebrations on Christmas day. The earliest textual evidence specifically mentioning large public Christmas fires occurs in 1577 and 1591, both occurring in legal charters from Germany. The first mention in 1577 is about how the monastery will be obligated to provide firewood to a tenant, and as well as a large special log on Christmas, on condition that the tenant allow the public to warm themselves by the fire. The second mention in 1591, says that the mayor is obliged to keep a large fire lit near the church on Christmas morning, so that any who are coming to matins and church may warm themselves.

It is not until John Aubrey's writing in the 17th century that any source mentions that the Yule log may offer some supernatural benefit (Aubrey mention the Christmas log bringing prosperity). It is then not until John Aubrey, writing in the mid 17th century nearly five centuries after the first mention of a large log meant to be burnt on Christmas eve, that the holiday of Yule was first associate with the practice when Aubrey mentioned that some in England also call this practice the Yule log.

Martin of Braga, Bishop of Braga, writing in 6th century, may have made the first mention of a tradition similar to the yule log in his work, De correctione rusticorum. In a section of his letter, he lists a variety of pagan practices that were still being performed by Christians in the 6th century and that he considered to be devil worship. One section of the list can be translated as "To take notice of the Volcanes and of the Calends, to garnish to tables, to lay laurel, to enter with the right foot, to pour grain and wine over a log in the hearth, and to throw bread into the fountains, what is this if not Devil worship? " Based on this translation, some scholars suggest that he is describing a ritual associated with the Kalends of January that would then go on to become the Yule log. The scholar Jacob Latham has suggested that in late antiquity the Kalends of January was no longer solely a pagan holiday but had been reinvented as a holiday that openly fused together Christian and pagan traditions and symbolism. All of the countries with the earliest accounts of the Yule log also were once part of the Roman empire. The practice described in the passage also resembles Yule log traditions in several countries where wine is poured over the log, such as France, Italy, Spain, and Montenegro. The passage also resembles a description of the Yule log found in writing from the court of the duke of Milan between 1466-1476 CE. It was recorded that on Christmas eve, a log, covered in fruits and foliage, especially juniper and laurel, was brought into the court at sunset, and was burned in the hearth for the enjoyment of all. Bishop Pirmin, in his book Dicta Abbatis Pirminii, de Singulis Libris Canonicis Scarapsus, which was written between 710-724 CE, quotes Martin of Braga when he is attempting to correct Christians who are still practicing pagan rituals. Notably, his quote leaves out any mention of the hearth or fire, only mentioning pouring fruit and wine over a stump. Yule log traditions in some parts of Croatia and Italy involve no fire or hearth, resembling Bishop Pirmin's fireless description as well. In a letter from Bonifacius to Pope Zacharius. written between 741-752 CE, there is a section where Bonifacius laments that Christians in Rome were still celebrating the Kalends of January in the pagan manner. Among a larger list of pagan activities, it is mentioned that the celebrants were not willing to lend fire, iron, or any convenience to their neighbor from their house. Scholar Alexander Tille interprets this reluctant to lend out fire as further evidence of there being a tradition of having private fires in the home on the Kalends of January.

== Diffusion and modern practices ==
The Yule log is recorded in the folklore archives of much of England, but particularly in collections covering the West Country and the North Country. For example, in his section regarding "Christmas Observances", J. B. Partridge recorded then-current (1914) Christmas customs in Yorkshire, Britain involving the Yule log as related by "Mrs. Day, Minchinhampton (Gloucestershire), a native of Swaledale". The custom is as follows:

The Yule log is generally given, and is at once put on the hearth. It is unlucky to have to light it again after it has once been started, and it ought not go out until it has burned away.

To sit around the Yule log and tell ghost stories is a great thing to do on this night, also card-playing.

Two large coloured candles are a Christmas present from the grocery. Just before supper on Christmas Eve (where frumenty is eaten), while the Yule log is burning, all other lights are put out, and the candles are lit from the Yule log by the youngest person present. While they are lit, all are silent and wish. It is common practice for the wish to be kept a secret. Once the candles are on the table, silence may be broken. They must be allowed to burn themselves out, and no other lights may be lit that night.

H. J. Rose records a similar folk belief from Killinghall, Yorkshire in 1923: "In the last generation the Yule log was still burned, and a piece of it saved to light the next year's log. On Christmas morning something green, a leaf or the like, was brought into the house before anything was taken out."

The Yule log is also attested as a custom present elsewhere in the English-speaking world, such as the United States. Robert Meyer, Jr. records in 1947 that a "Yule-Log Ceremony" in Palmer Lake, Colorado had occurred since 1934. He describes the custom: "It starts with the yule log [sic] hunt and is climaxed by drinking of wassail around the fire." In the Southern United States before the end of the American Civil War, the Yule log was also maintained as a tradition. For example, according to scholar Allen Cabaniss:

For slaves, Christmas had special meaning. December was a slow work month on the typical plantation, and it became the social season for them. The slaves' holiday lasted until the Yule log burned, which sometimes took over a week.

== Regional variations and analogues ==
=== Albania ===
Nata e Buzmit, "Yule log's night", is traditionally celebrated by Albanians between December 22 and January 6. Buzmi is a ritualistic piece of wood (or several pieces of wood) that is put to burn in the fire (zjarri) of the hearth (vatër) on the night of a winter celebration that falls after the return of the Sun (Dielli) for summer (after the winter solstice), sometimes on the night of Kërshëndella on December 24 (Christmas Eve), sometimes on the night of kolendra, or sometimes on New Year's Day or on any other occasion around the same period, a tradition that is originally related to the cult of the Sun.

A series of rituals of a magical character are performed with the buzmi, which, based on old beliefs, aims at agricultural plant growth and for the prosperity of production in the living thing (production of vegetables, trees, vineyards, etc.). This practice has been traditionally found among all Albanians, also documented among the Arbëreshë in Italy and the Arvanites in Greece until the first half of the 20th century, and it is still preserved in remote Albanian ethnographic regions today.

The richest set of rites related to buzmi are found in northern Albania (Mirdita, Pukë, Dukagjin, Malësia e Madhe, Shkodër and Lezhë, as well as in Kosovo, Dibër and so on.

=== United Kingdom ===
Scholars have observed similarities between the Yule log and the folk custom of the ashen faggot, recorded solely in the West Country of England. First recorded at the beginning of the 19th century, the ashen faggot is burnt on Christmas Eve, is associated with a variety of folk beliefs, and is "made of smaller ash sticks bound into a faggot with strips of hazel, withy, or bramble". G. R. Wiley observes that the ashen faggot may have developed out of the Yule log.

The term "Yule log" is not the only term used to refer to the custom. It was commonly called a "Yule Clog" in north-east England, and it was also called the "Yule Block" in the Midlands and West Country and "Gule Block" in Lincolnshire. In Cornwall, the term "Stock of the Mock" was found. In Wales it's called Boncyff Nadolig or Blocyn y Gwyliau (the Christmas Log or the Festival Block). In Scotland it's called Yeel Carline (the Christmas Old Wife).

=== Ireland ===
In Ireland, the yule log is called Bloc na Nollag (the Christmas Block).

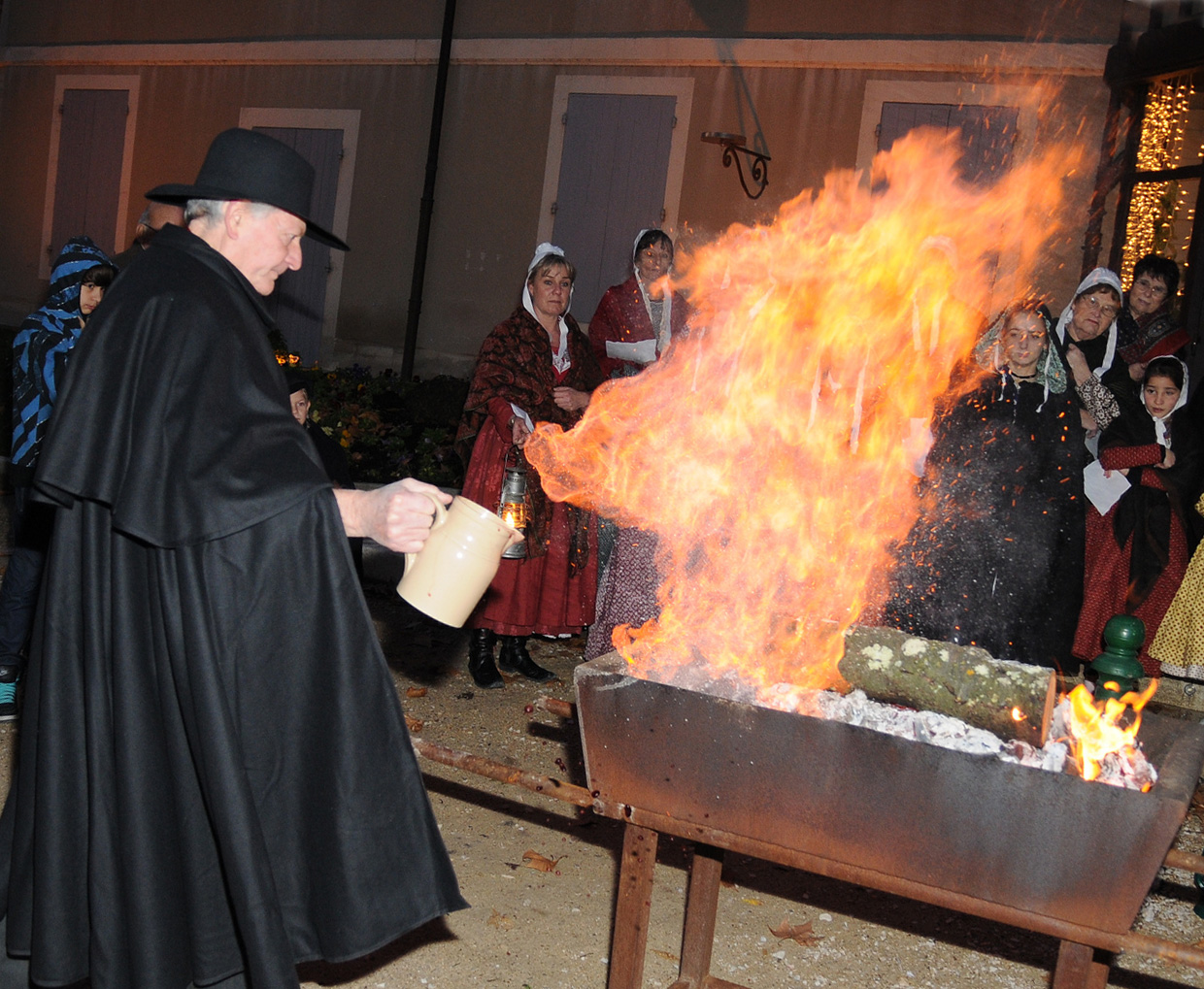
Cacho fio Noël celebrations in Beaumes-de-Venise.

=== Germany ===
In Germany, where it’s called Christklotz, Christbrand, Christblock, Julklotz or Julblock it was customary, especially in Hesse and Westphalia, to burn the log slowly and then remove it and throw it back on the fire as protection from lightning.

=== France ===
The custom of burning a Yule log for one or more nights starting on Christmas Eve was also formerly widespread in France, where the usual term is bûche de noël. This may derive from a custom requiring peasants to bring a log to their lord. In Burgundy, gifts would be hidden under the log. Prayers were offered as the log was lighted in Brittany and in Provence, where the custom is still widely observed and called cacho fio (blessing of the log): the log, or branch from a fruit-bearing tree, is first paraded three times around the house by the grandfather of the family, then blessed with wine; it is often lighted together with the saved ashes of the previous year's log. Other regional names include cosse de Nau in Berry, mouchon de Nau in Angoumois, chuquet in Normandy, souche in the Île de France, and tréfouiau in the Vendée. The custom has now long been replaced by the eating of a log-shaped cake, also named Bûche de Noël.

=== Portugal ===
In Portugal, the Madeiros de Natal are big bonfires that are lit in the center of the village, in the main square or in the churchyard on Christmas Eve.

The remains of the log were preserved as they were believed to prevent damage usually caused by storms.

=== Spain ===
In Galicia, the Galicians also have their local variant of this tradition known as tizón de Nadal or cepo de Nadal.

In Asturias the Nataliegu burns from December 24 until the new year in the fireplace of many houses and leaves sweet buns for the children. Then his ashes, which were attributed healing and protective powers for the home, were scattered around the house, the stables and other rooms.

In High Aragon it is called tizón de Nadal. The children of the house are in charge of saying beautiful phrases, blessings and rituals (although in some places the blessing is done by the oldest or owner of the house). Sometimes the blessing is done after filling the log with a little wine while the blessing is said.

Catalan People have a similar tradition, where Tió de Nadal is a magic log "fed" before Christmas. Singing children cover the tió with a blanket and beat him with sticks to make the tió defecate nougat candy and small gifts. In the eastern areas in contact with Catalonia, the ritual has a more playful part, when the children of the house hit the log so it "shits" the presents, which are usually jellies, candies, nuts and other things to eat or play.

=== Pyrenean Europe ===
In Basque Country, Subilaro-egur also burns until the end of the year. The log gives life to good wishes, burns curses, prevents diseases and ensures good harvests. Alternate names include eguberri, gabon, gabonzuzi, gabon-subil, gabon-mukur, olentzero-enbor, onontzoro-mokor, suklaro-egur, sukubela or porrondoko. Olentzero is a modern personification of the old log.

In Occitania the “cachafuòc” or “soc de Nadal” it's also one of the traditional elements that accompany and cheer up Christmas.

=== Italy ===
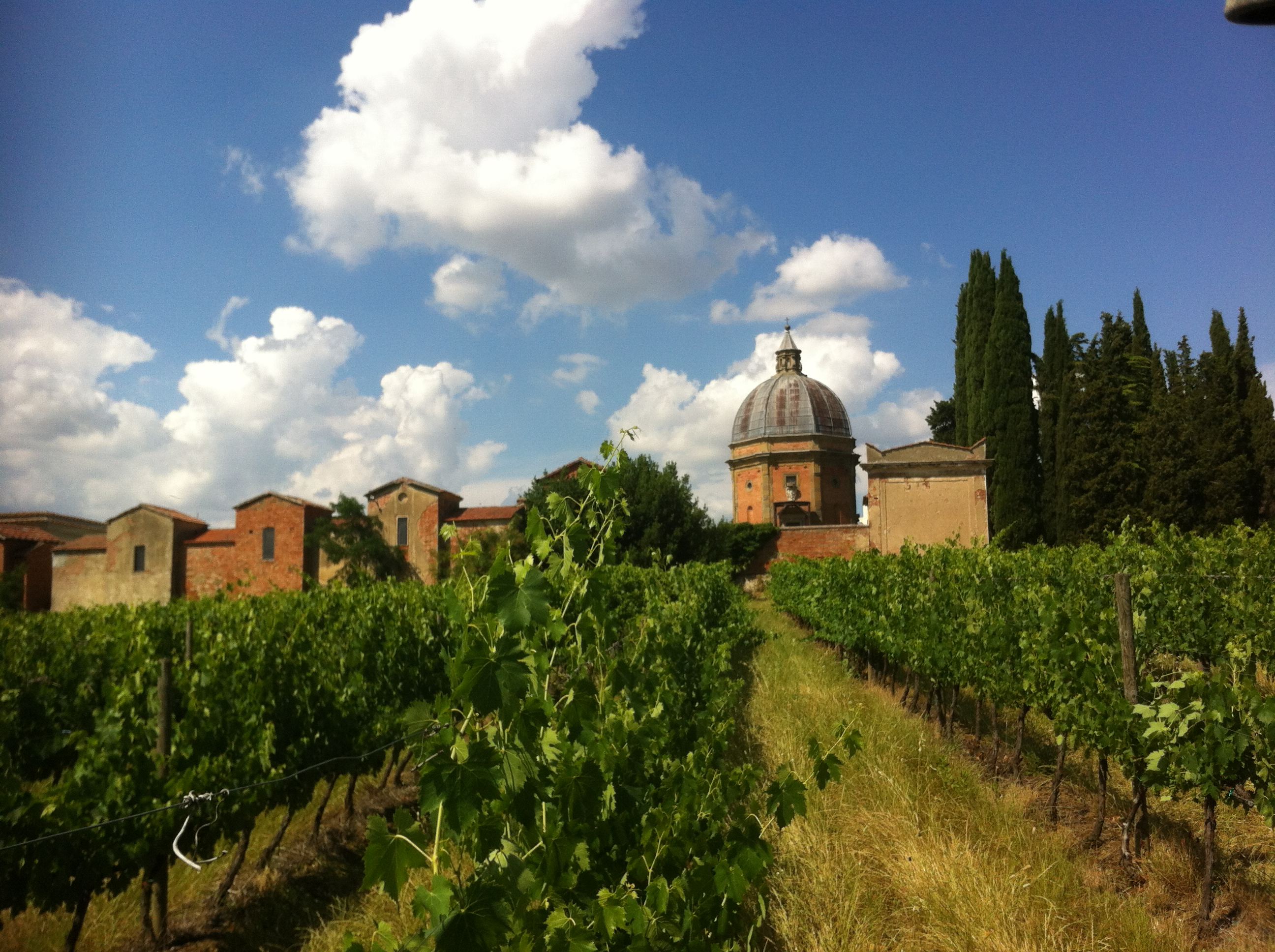
Val di Chiana, Tuscany, Italy, where it was customary to sing a prayer during the "cerimonia del ceppo" (log ceremony). Later, blindfolded children (later rewarded with sweets and other gifts), had to hit the log, while the rest of the family sang a particular song, called "Ave Maria del Ceppo".

Christmas in Italy begins on 8 December with the Feast of the Immaculate Conception, the day on which traditionally Christmas trees are erected, and ends on 6 January of the following year with Epiphany.

The tradition of the Yule log, once widespread, has been attested in Italy since the 15th century. The Yule log appears with different names depending on the region: in Tuscany it is known as ciocco, while in Lombardy it is known as zocco. In Lombardy, the head of the family used to sprinkle juniper on the stump and place coins on it while reciting a prayer in the name of the Trinity. Afterwards, people drank as much as they liked and the remaining wine was thrown by the head of the family on the log. It was also customary, during the log ceremony, to cut three panettone and keep a piece for thaumaturgical purposes for the whole of the following year

In Tuscany, in particular in Val di Chiana (province of Arezzo), it was customary to chant the following prayer during the Christmas log ceremony. Later, blindfolded children (rewarded with sweets and other gifts), had to hit the log with pincers, while the rest of the family sang a particular song, called "Ave Maria del Ceppo".

In eastern Sicily, especially in the Etna areas, the Christmas log (Zuccu in dialect) is customary to stack wood in a pyramidal way in the squares of the villages, tradition has it that it is lit on the evening of the 24th before the midnight mass after the blessing of the priest. In addition to recalling the Christian symbolism of the "light source of life", it becomes a pleasant opportunity, after the celebration of the midnight vigil, to stop around the log and exchange Christmas greetings wrapped in the heat of the flames.In Val di Chiana, in Tuscany, it was customary for children, blindfolded, to hit the block with pincers, while the rest of the family sang the Ave Maria del Ceppo. That tradition was once deeply rooted in Italy is demonstrated by the fact that Christmas in Tuscany was called the "feast of the log".

=== Montenegro ===
In Montenegro, it was customary to put a piece of bread on the log and (similar to the Lombard custom) sprinkle it with wine.

=== Baltics ===
Baltic people also have a similar ritual called "log pulling" (Latvian: bluķa vilkšana; Lithuanian: blukio vilkimas) where people in a village would drag a log (Latvian: bluķis; Lithuanian: blukis) or a tree stump through the village at the winter solstice and then at the end burn it.

=== Balkans ===
Serbian people have a similar tradition in which oak is burned.

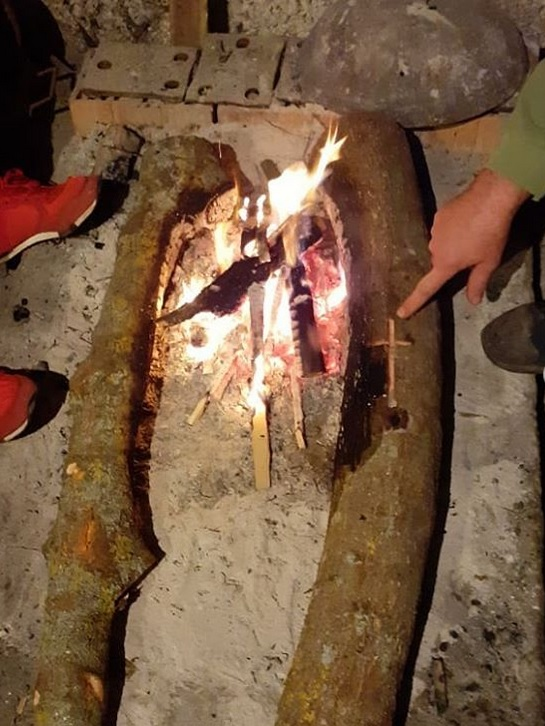
Badnjak logs burning in the hearth, Christmas Eve in Dalmatia.

As early as Jacob Grimm in the early 19th century, scholars have observed parallels between the South Slavic custom of the Badnjak and the Yule log tradition. As observed by M. E. Durham (1940), the Badnjak is a sapling that is placed on the hearth on Christmas Eve. Varying customs involving the Badnjak may be performed, such as smearing it with fowl blood or goat blood and the ashes may be "strewn on the fields or garden to promote fertility on New Year's Eve".

=== Greece ===
In Greece, the yule log was believed to drive away the kallikantzaroi, the evil monsters of local folklore, from one's home.

=== United States ===
In the United States, a local New York television station first broadcast a six-minute loop of a yule log burning in a fireplace over the course of several hours. The broadcast, called simply Yule Log, premiered in full color on Dec. 24, 1966, at 9:30 p.m. on WPIX (Channel 11 in New York City) and became a yearly tradition. The original Yule Log footage was filmed on 16 millimeter film at Gracie Mansion, New York City's mayoral residence. New footage of a flaming yule log was shot in 1970, in a different location, producing a seven-minute loop on 35 millimeter film. The station still broadcasts the Yule Log for four to five hours every Christmas morning and, through the years, has had many imitators at television stations across the country. In 2024, Roku, Inc. launched a 24-hour Yule log FAST channel on their streaming players through The Roku Channel.

== See also ==
- Sacred trees and groves in Germanic paganism and mythology
- Yule log (cake)
