= Ashen faggot =

English Christmas tradition

The ashen faggot (also known as ashton fagot) is an old English Christmas tradition from Devon and Somerset, similar to that of the Yule log and related to the wassail tradition.

A faggot is a large log or a bundle of ash sticks. It was bound with nine green lengths of ash bands or 'beams', preferably all from the same tree. At the appropriate moment during Christmas Eve, the faggot must be burnt in a hearth while people who are watching sing the "Dunster Carol".

== Historical significance ==
Ash was probably chosen for this ritual because the ash tree has a long pedigree of magical associations: perhaps the most important is the Yggdrasil of Norse mythology, also known as the World Ash Tree.

The Christian version of the use of ash was when Mary used wood to light a fire in order to wash infant Jesus. In Romanian culture, it was thought that Jesus was born in a field and that he was kept warm by the head of an ash.

== Christmas Eve ritual ==
The wassail party passes around a bundle of ash sticks, twigs or branches—the remnant of the previous year's faggot—bound with green ash withies, which is then placed onto the fire. It is done traditionally by the oldest person in the room. The heat created is a comfort in midwinter nights.

As each binding bursts, the watchers toast it with a drink. Some traditions had the unmarried women each choosing a withy, and the first one whose tie snapped would be married the next year.

When the bindings have all burst and the bundle has fallen loose, each person who plans to host the festivities next year takes one of the half-burned ash sticks and saves it until the following Christmas, when it will go in the centre of their own ashen faggot. This tradition symbolizes continuity of life and endures (or has been resurrected) in many places; the Winter 2005 issue of Devon Talk claims that the Harbour Inn in Axmouth annually builds an ashen faggot six feet high and three feet wide for their huge fireplace.

This tradition survives in pubs on the border between Devon and Somerset and is celebrated on the evening of 6 January each year (old Christmas Eve). Here the ritual centres on an ashen faggot around twelve feet in length bound by approximately a dozen withies. At the beginning of the evening, the butt of the faggot is placed against the rear of the fireplace, where a fire is already ablaze. Bets are then placed on the length of time (which is usually several hours) until the last binding bursts, with the closest estimate winning a prize and the proceeds going to charity.

Famous pubs where the tradition continues to take place include The Squirrel Inn at Laymore, Somerset and The Harbour Inn at Axmouth, Devon. At Taunton in the early 19th century, an Ashen Faggot Ball was held on 31 December. Another famous pub where the tradition used to take place was The Ashen Faggot Inn in Northleigh, Devon which is now a private dwelling renamed 'Ashen House'.

It was believed that any household that did not burn the ashen faggot would face years of bad luck and misfortune. Some versions suggest that an ashen faggot kept in the house would keep away the Devil and evil spirits.

== In popular media ==
Shirley Collins's song the "Ashen Faggot Wassail", on her 1974 Topic album Adieu to Old England, is a celebration of the tradition.

== See also ==
- Wassail
- Cultural aspects of the ash tree
