= Tió de Nadal =

Catalan Christmas Tradition

The Tió de Nadal (Eastern Catalan: [tiˈo ðə nəˈðal], Western Catalan: [tiˈo ðe naˈðal]; 'Christmas Log'), also known simply as tió ('log'), soca or tronc(a) ('trunk'), is a character in Catalan mythology relating to a Christmas tradition practiced in Catalonia, Valencia (occasionally), Mallorca (known as Nadaler), Aragon, Occitania and Andorra. In Aragon it is also called, in Aragonese, Tizón de Nadal, Toza de Nadal or Tronca de Nadal.

The Tió de Nadal is related to the tradition of the Germanic Christmas tree, also a bearer of gifts for the little ones, and with the British Yule log (tizón do Nadal in Galicia and Cachafuòc, Cachofio or Soc de Nadal in Occitania).

== Overview ==
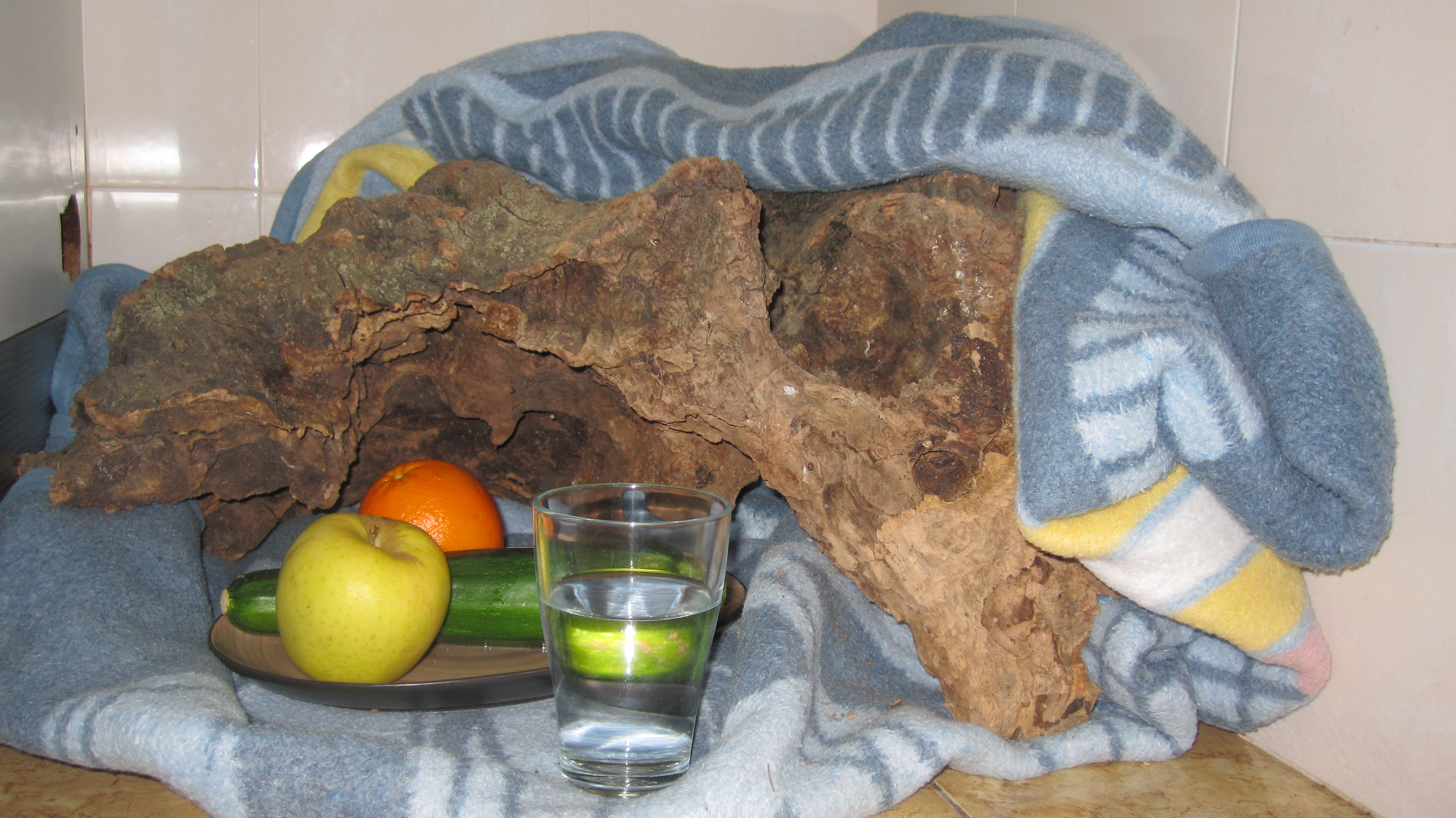
Photograph of a traditional Tió

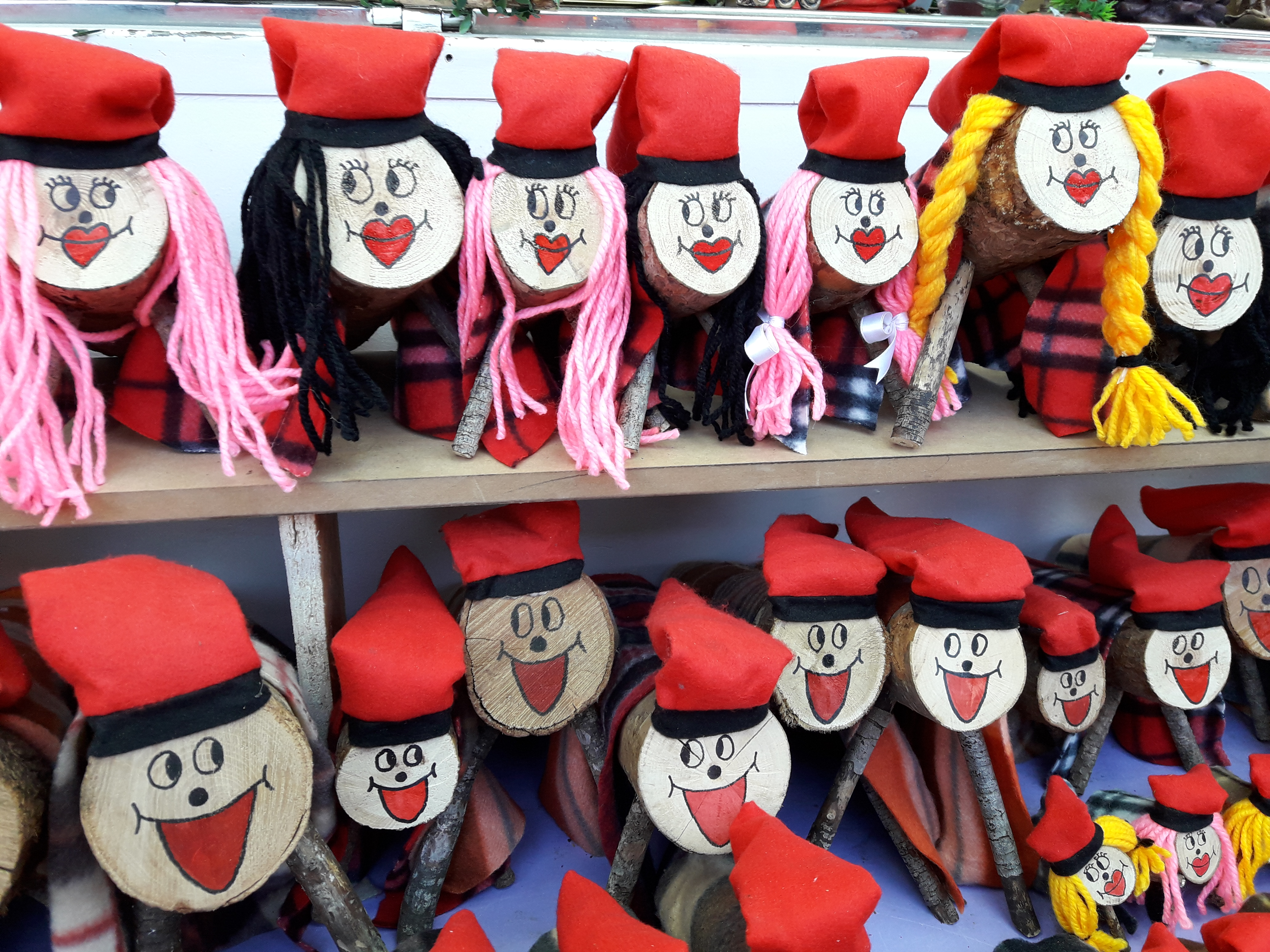
Christmas logs

The form of the Tió de Nadal found in many Catalan homes during the holiday season is a hollow log about 30 cm (12 in) long. Recently, the Tió has come to stand up on two or four stick legs with a broad smiling face painted on its higher end, enhanced by a red sock hat (a miniature of the traditional barretina) and often a three-dimensional nose. Those accessories have been added only in recent times, altering the more traditional and rough natural appearance of a piece of wood.

Beginning with the Feast of the Immaculate Conception (December 8), one gives the tió a little bit to "eat" every night and usually covers him with a blanket so that he will not be cold. The story goes that in the days preceding Christmas, children must take good care of the log, keeping it warm and feeding it, so that it will defecate presents on Christmas Day or Eve.

On Christmas Day or, in some households, on Christmas Eve, children will spank the log and order it to defecate. The fire part of this tradition is no longer as widespread as it once was, since many modern homes do not have a fireplace. To make it defecate, one beats the tió with sticks, while singing various songs of Tió de Nadal.

The tradition says that before beating the tió all of the children must leave the room and go to another part of the house to pray, asking for the tió to deliver a lot of presents. Nowadays, the praying tradition has been left behind. Still, children go to a different room, usually the kitchen, to warm their stick next to a fire.

The tió does not drop larger objects, as those are considered to be brought by the Three Wise Men on Epiphany, January 6. It does leave candies, nuts, torrons, and small toys, similar to the gifts in a Christmas stocking in English-speaking areas. Depending on the region of Catalonia, it may also give out dried figs. What comes out of the Tió is a communal rather than individual gift, shared by everyone there.

The tió is often popularly called Caga tió ("shitting log", "poo log"). This derives from the many songs of Tió de Nadal that begin with this phrase, which was originally (in the context of the songs) an imperative ("Shit, log!"). The use of this expression as a name is not believed to be part of the ancient tradition and its use is discouraged.

== Caga, tió song ==
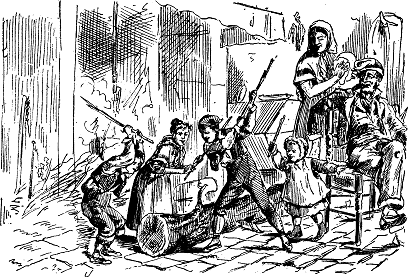
Beating the Tió de Nadal

A song is sung during this celebration. After hitting the tió softly with a stick during the song, it is hit harder on the words Caga, tió! Then somebody puts their hand under the blanket and takes a gift. The gift is opened and then the song begins again. There are many Caga, tió songs connected to the holiday and the log. The following variant is one of the more popular versions of this song:

Catalan

Caga, tió,
tió de Nadal
no caguis arengades
que són massa salades,
caga torrons
que són més bons.
Caga, tió,
ametlles i torró,
i, si no vols cagar,
et donaré un cop de bastó!
Caga, tió!

Central Catalan (Eastern) IPA (Note: See Help:IPA/Catalan and Catalan phonology.)

[ˈka.ɣ̞ə t̪iˈo]
[t̪iˈo ð̞ə nəˈð̞aɫ]
[ˈno ˈka.ɣ̞iz ə.ɾəŋˈɡa.ð̞əs]
[kə ˈsom ˈma.sə səˈɫa.ð̞əs]
[ˈka.ɣ̞ə t̪uˈrons]
[kə ˈsom ˈmez ˈbɔns]
[ˈka.ɣ̞ə t̪iˈo]
[əˈmɛʎ.ʎəz i t̪uˈro]
[i si ˈno ˈβ̞ɔɫs kəˈɣ̞a]
[əd̪ d̪u.nəˈɾe uŋ ˈkɔb d̪ə β̞əsˈt̪o]
[ˈka.ɣ̞ə t̪iˈo]

North-Western Catalan (Western) IPA

[ˈka.ɣ̞a t̪iˈo]
[t̪iˈo ð̞e naˈð̞aɫ]
[ˈno ˈka.ɣ̞iz a.ɾeŋˈɡa.ð̞es]
[ke ˈsom ˈma.sa saˈɫa.ð̞es]
[ˈka.ɣ̞a t̪oˈrons]
[ke ˈsom ˈmez ˈbɔns]
[ˈka.ɣ̞a t̪iˈo]
[aˈmeʎ.ʎez i t̪oˈro]
[i si ˈno ˈβ̞ɔɫs kaˈɣ̞a]
[ed̪ d̪o.naˈɾe uŋ ˈkɔb d̪e β̞asˈt̪o]
[ˈka.ɣ̞a t̪iˈo]

English translation

Shit, tió,
Christmas log
do not shit herrings,
for they are too salty,
shit nougats
for they taste better.
Shit, tió,
almonds and nougats,
and if you don't want to shit
I will hit you with a stick!
Shit, tió!

== See also ==
- Bûche de Noël
- Caganer
- Piñata
- Yule log
- National symbols of Catalonia
