= Caganer =

Figurine depicted in the act of defecation

A Caganer (Catalan pronunciation: [kəɣəˈne]) is a figurine depicted in the act of defecation appearing in nativity scenes in Catalonia and neighbouring areas such as Andorra, Valencia, Balearic Islands, and Northern Catalonia (in southern France). It is most popular and widespread in these areas, but can also be found in other areas of Spain (Murcia) and Portugal.

The name "El Caganer" literally means "the pooper". Traditionally, the figurine is depicted as a peasant, wearing the traditional Catalan red cap (the barretina) and with his trousers down, showing a bare backside, and defecating.

== Origins ==
The exact origin of the Caganer is unknown, but the tradition has existed since at least the 18th century. According to the society Amics del Caganer (Friends of the Caganer), it is believed to have entered the nativity scene by the late 17th or early 18th century, during the Baroque period.

== Tradition ==
In Catalan Countries, as well as in the rest of Spain and in most of Italy and Southern France, traditional Christmas decorations often consist of a large model of the city of Bethlehem, similar to the Nativity scenes of the English-speaking world but encompassing the entire city rather than just the typical manger scene. This pessebre is often a reproduction of a pastoral scene—a traditional Catalan masia (farmhouse) as the central setting with the child in a manger, and outlying scenes including a washerwoman by a river, a woman spinning, shepherds herding their sheep or walking towards the manger with gifts, the Three Wise Men approaching on camel back, a scene with the angel and shepherds, the star pointing the way, etc. Commonly materials such as moss will be used to represent grass, with cork used to represent mountains or cliffs.

The caganer is a particular and highly popular feature of modern Catalan nativity scenes. It is believed to have entered the nativity scene by the late 17th or early 18th century, during the Baroque period. Eminent folklorist Joan Amades called it an essential piece and the most popular figure of the nativity scene. It can also be found in other parts of southwestern Europe, including Murcia, the region just south of Valencia in Spain (where they are called cagones) and Portugal (cagões). There is a sculpture of a person defecating hidden inside the cathedral of Ciudad Rodrigo, Province of Salamanca, though this is not part of a nativity scene. Accompanying Mary, Joseph, Jesus, the shepherds and company, the caganer is often tucked away in a corner of the model, typically nowhere near the manger scene. A tradition in Catalonia is to have children find the hidden figure.

== Explanations ==
Possible reasons for placing a figure representing a person in the act of emptying his bowels in a scene which is widely considered holy include:

- The Caganer, by creating faeces, is fertilizing the Earth. According to the ethnographer Joan Amades, it was a "customary figure in nativity scenes [pessebres] in the 19th century, because people believed that this deposit [symbolically] fertilized the ground of the nativity scenes, which became fertile and ensured the nativity scene for the following year, and with it, the health of body and peace of mind required to make the nativity scene, with the joy and happiness brought by Christmas near the hearth. Placing this figurine in the nativity scene brought good luck and joy and not doing so brought adversity."
- Many modern caganers represent celebrities and authority figures. By representing them with their pants down, the caganer serves as a levelling device to bring the mighty down.
- As to the charge of blasphemy, as Catalan anthropologist Miguel Delgado has pointed out, the grotesque, rather than a negation of the divine may actually signify an intensification of the sacred, for what could be more grotesque than the crucifixion of Jesus Christ, a bloody public torture and execution as the defining moment in the story of Christianity?
- In his essay Les virtuts cìviques del caganer ("The Civic Virtues of the Defecator"), American anthropologist Brad Erickson argues that Catalans use the caganer to process and respond to contemporary social issues such as immigration and the imposition of public civility regulations.

Further opinions:

- "The caganer was the most mischievous and out-of-place character of the pessebre's [otherwise] idyllic landscape; he was the "Other", with everything that entails, and as the "Other", was accepted, in a liberal vein, as long as he did not aim to occupy the foreground. The caganer represented the spoilsport that we all have inside of us, and that's why it is not surprising that it was the most beloved figure among the children and, above all, the adolescents, who were already beginning to feel rather like outsiders at the family celebration." Agustí Pons
- "The caganer is a hidden figure and yet is always sought out like the lost link between transcendence and contingency. Without the caganer, there would be no nativity scene but rather a liturgy, and there would be no real country but just the false landscape of a model." Joan Barril
- "The caganer seems to provide a counterpoint to so much ornamental hullabaloo, so much emotive treacle, so much contrived beauty." Josep Murgades
- "The caganer is, like so many other things that have undergone the filtering of a great many generations, a cult object; with the playful, aesthetic and superficial devotion that we feel towards all the silly things that fascinate us deep down." Jordi Soler

== Similar traditions ==
The Caganer is not the only defecating character in the Catalan Christmas tradition—another is the Tió de Nadal, which also makes extensive use of the image of faecal matter (it is a log, i.e. tió which, having been "fed" for several weeks, is told to defecate on Christmas Eve and "magically" produces candy for children, a candy that has supposedly come from its bowels). Other mentions of faeces and defecation are common in Catalan folklore: indeed, a popular Catalan saying for use before a meal is menja bé, caga fort i no tinguis por a la mort! ("Eat well, shit heartily, and don't be afraid of death!"). In his book Barcelona, architecture critic and locale historian Robert Hughes gives a good introduction to this earthy tradition.

The Caganer can also be found in other European cultures, either as an import or a minor local tradition:

- In France: Père la Colique ("Father Colic"). In France this figure seems to date from the 1930s or 1940s.
- In Murcia, the region just south of the Valencian Community in Spain (where they are called cagones)
- Portugal, where they are known as cagões

== Traditional vs. modern portrayals ==
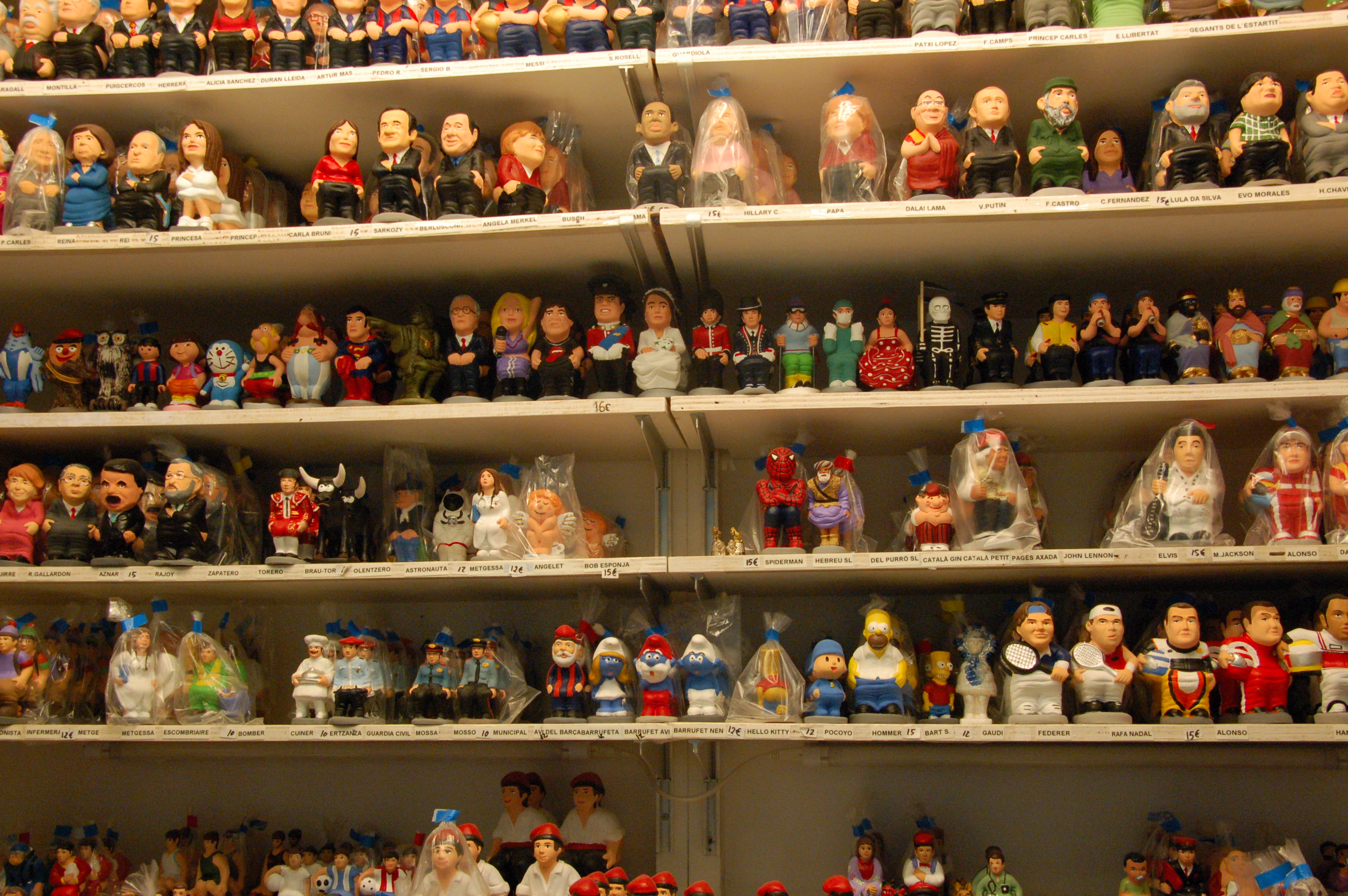
Modern caricature caganers for sale

The traditional caganer is portrayed as a Catalan peasant man (i.e. a farmer or shepherd) wearing a typical hat called a Barretina—a red stocking hat with a black band. At least since the late 1970s, the figure of a traditional Catalan peasant woman was also added, wearing traditional garb including the long black hairnet.

The Catalans have modified this tradition a good deal since the 1940s. In addition to the traditional caganer design, one can easily find other characters assuming the Caganer position, such as nuns, devils, Santa Claus, celebrities, athletes, historical figures, politicians, Spanish royalty, British royalty, and other famous people past and present. Just days after his election as US president in 2008, a "pooper" of Barack Obama was made available.

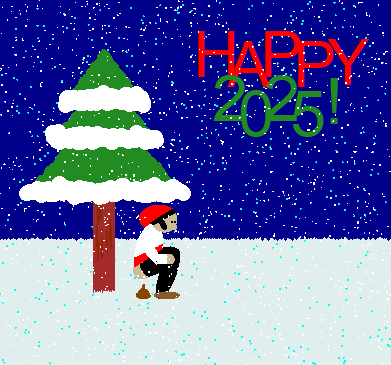
A caganer produced using the christmas package in R, which was developed by Jose Barrera-Gomez

A digital greeting card depicting a caganer can be produced using the christmas package in R, a free software environment for statistical computing. The following code produces the image:

install.packages("christmas")
library(christmas)
xmascaganer(year = 2025)

== At markets and exhibits ==
Caganers are easiest to find before Christmas in holiday markets, like the one in front of the Cathedral of Santa Eulalia, which has many tables of Caganers. Every year new figures are created, and some people collect them. Caganers are the focal point of at least one association (Els Amics del Caganer, i.e. Friends of the Caganer), which puts out a regular bulletin ("El Caganòfil"), and have even been featured in art exhibits.

In recent years a urinating statue, or Pixaner, has also appeared, but it has not taken root or gained any serious popularity.

== Controversy surrounding Barcelona's civility ordinance ==
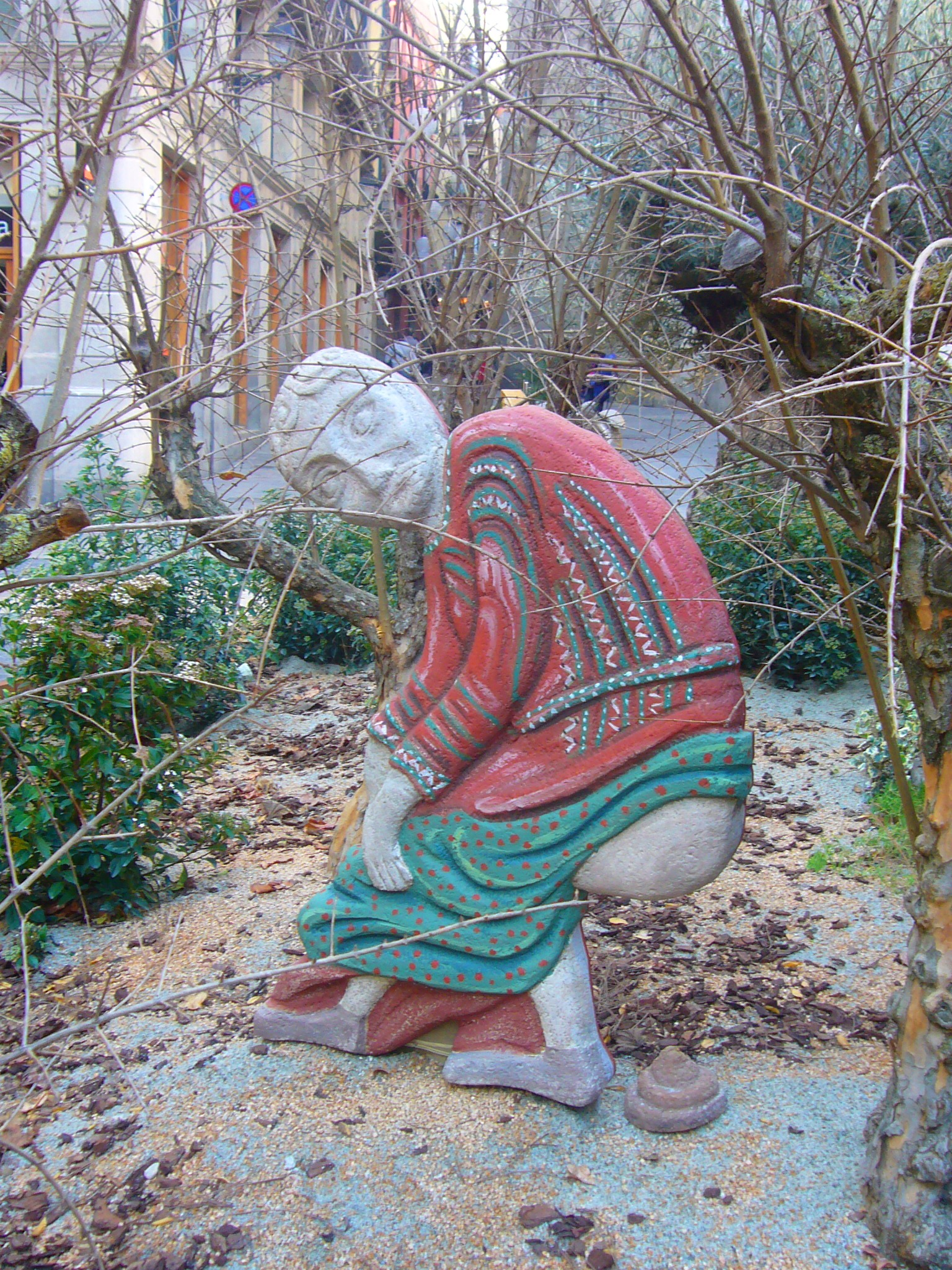
The caganer in the 2011 official nativity scene in Barcelona's Plaça de Sant Jaume

In 2005, the Barcelona city council provoked a public outcry by commissioning a nativity scene which did not include a caganer. The local government was reported to have countered these criticisms by claiming that the Caganer was not included because a civility ordinance had made public defecation and public urination illegal, meaning that the caganer was now setting a bad example. Many saw this as an attack on Catalan traditions. One writer of a letter to the editor asserted, "A nativity scene without a caganer is not a nativity scene." A second writer offered a win-win solution. He suggested including the caganer but also placing a figure of a police officer with a pen and clipboard next to him, writing a ticket for the infraction. The writer said this would achieve three objectives: respect tradition, comply with the ordinance and educate the public about how it is being reinforced, and finally, demonstrate how important it is to respect the law. Finally, the head of Parks and Gardens publicly denied prohibiting the caganer in the first place, saying that it was the artistic decision of the artist commissioned by the city to design and install the pessebre. Following a campaign against the caganer's absence called Salvem el caganer (Save the caganer), and widespread media criticism, the 2006 nativity restored the caganer, who appeared on the northern side of the nativity near a dry riverbed.

== See also ==
- Mooning – the act of displaying one's bare buttocks
- Tió de Nadal
- Kin no unko
