= Barretina =

Traditional hat worn by men in the Christian cultures of the Mediterranean Sea

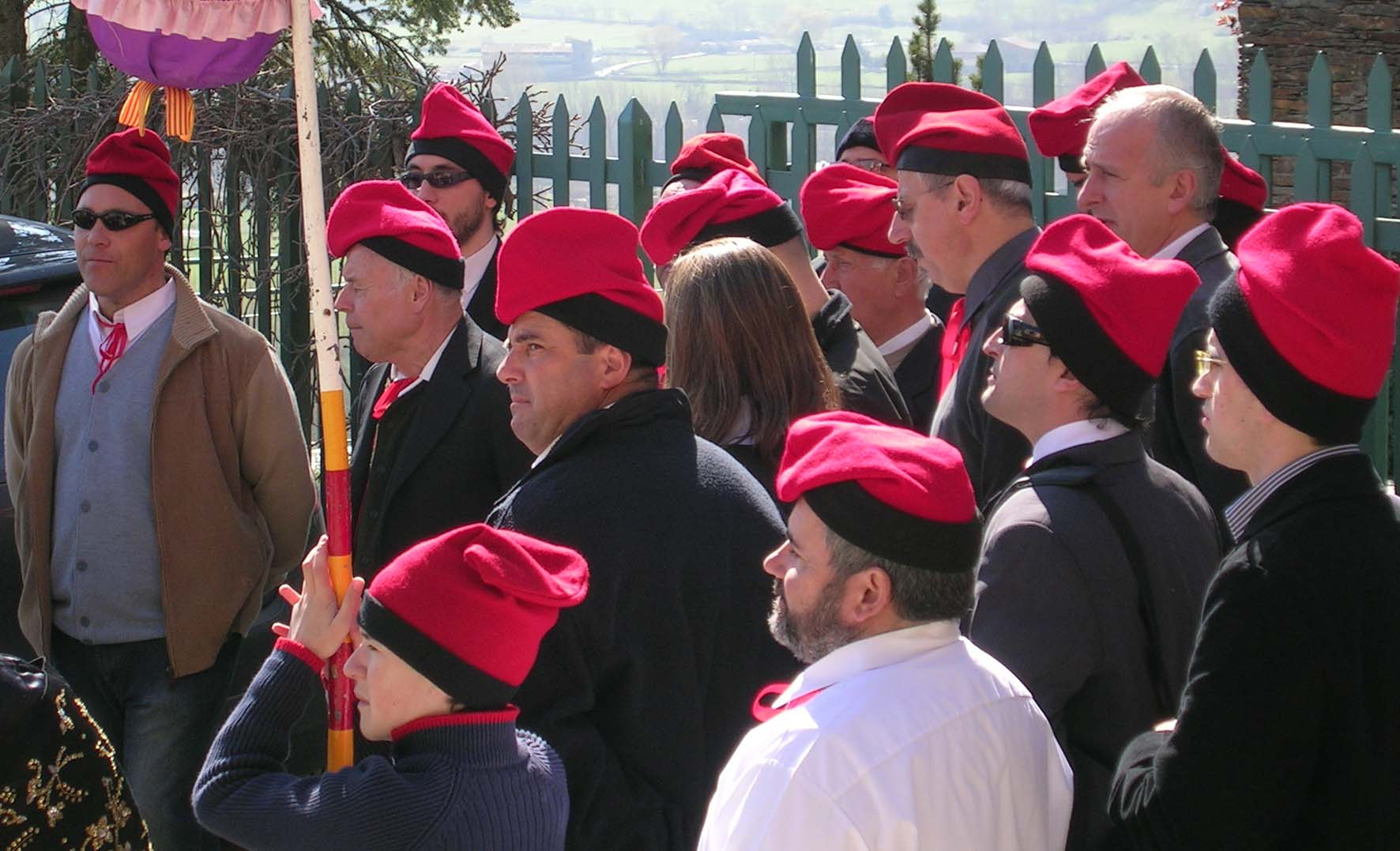
Catalan men wearing barretines

A barretina (Catalan pronunciation: [bərəˈtinə]; plural: barretines, diminutive of barret is barretine) is a traditional hat that was frequently worn by men in parts of the Christian cultures of the Mediterranean Sea, such as Catalonia, the Balearic Islands, Provence, Corsica, Sicily, Malta, Sardinia, part of Naples, part of the Balkans and parts of Portugal. It was also worn by Muslim men in Mallorca until the Christian conquest of the island in the Middle Ages.

== History ==
In Catalonia and Ibiza, men wore barretinas until the 19th century, especially in rural areas. Even in the 1940s and the 1950s, children in rural areas still commonly wore it.

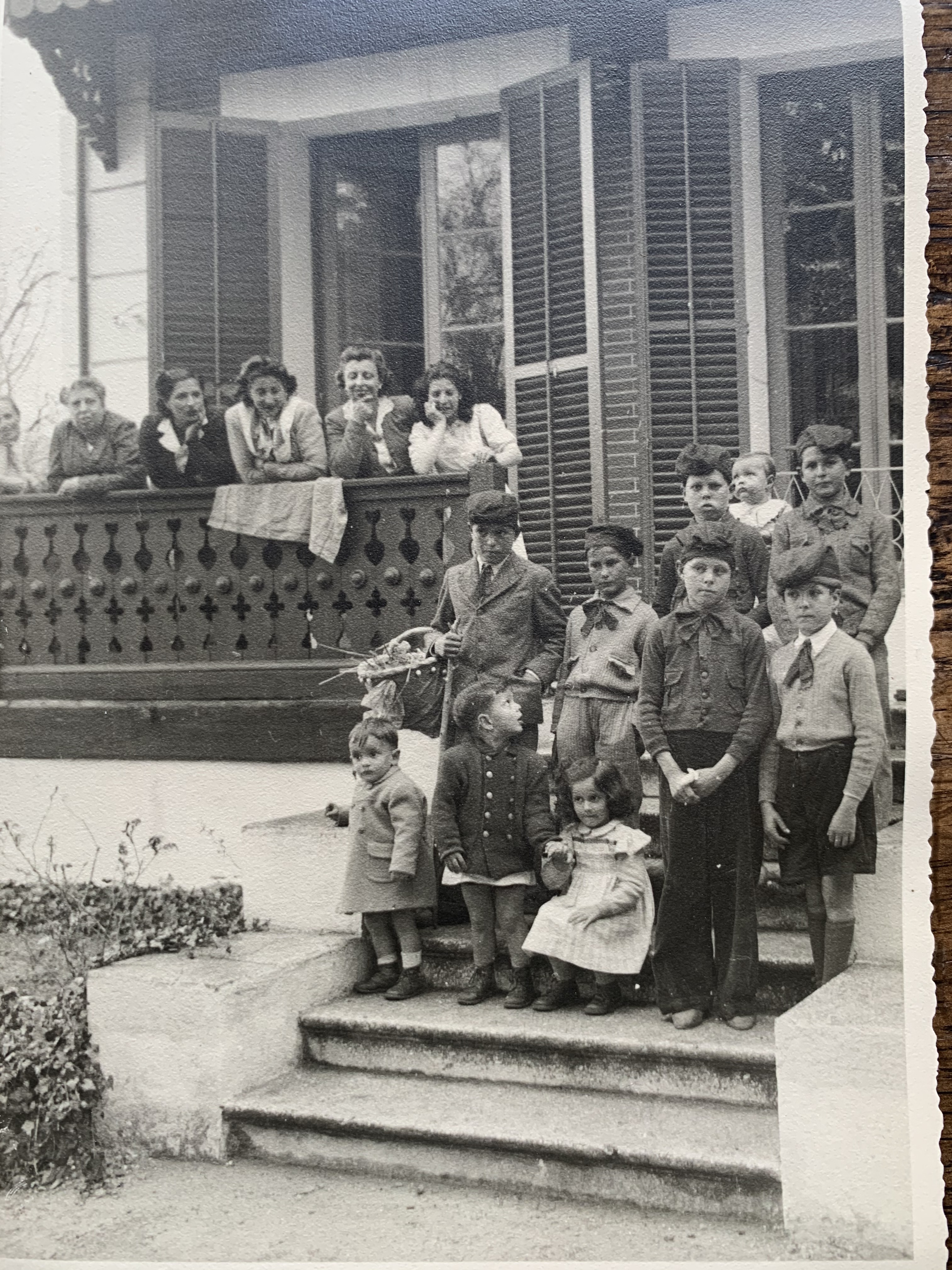
Country and small village life late 1940s and early 1950s, Catalan children, wearing barretines

It took the form of a bag, made of wool, usually red, or sometimes purple.

Today, the barretina is no longer commonly worn in everyday life but is still used in traditional dances or as a symbol of Catalan identity. Perhaps one of the most iconic Catalan images is a watercolor painting entitled "The Newspaper Seller," dated from 1885. The painting depicts a weathered old man who stands with a collection of newspapers overflowing the wooden box he carries around his neck with a leather strap. He is wearing a scarf, with an umbrella behind him, and there is a barretina on his head.

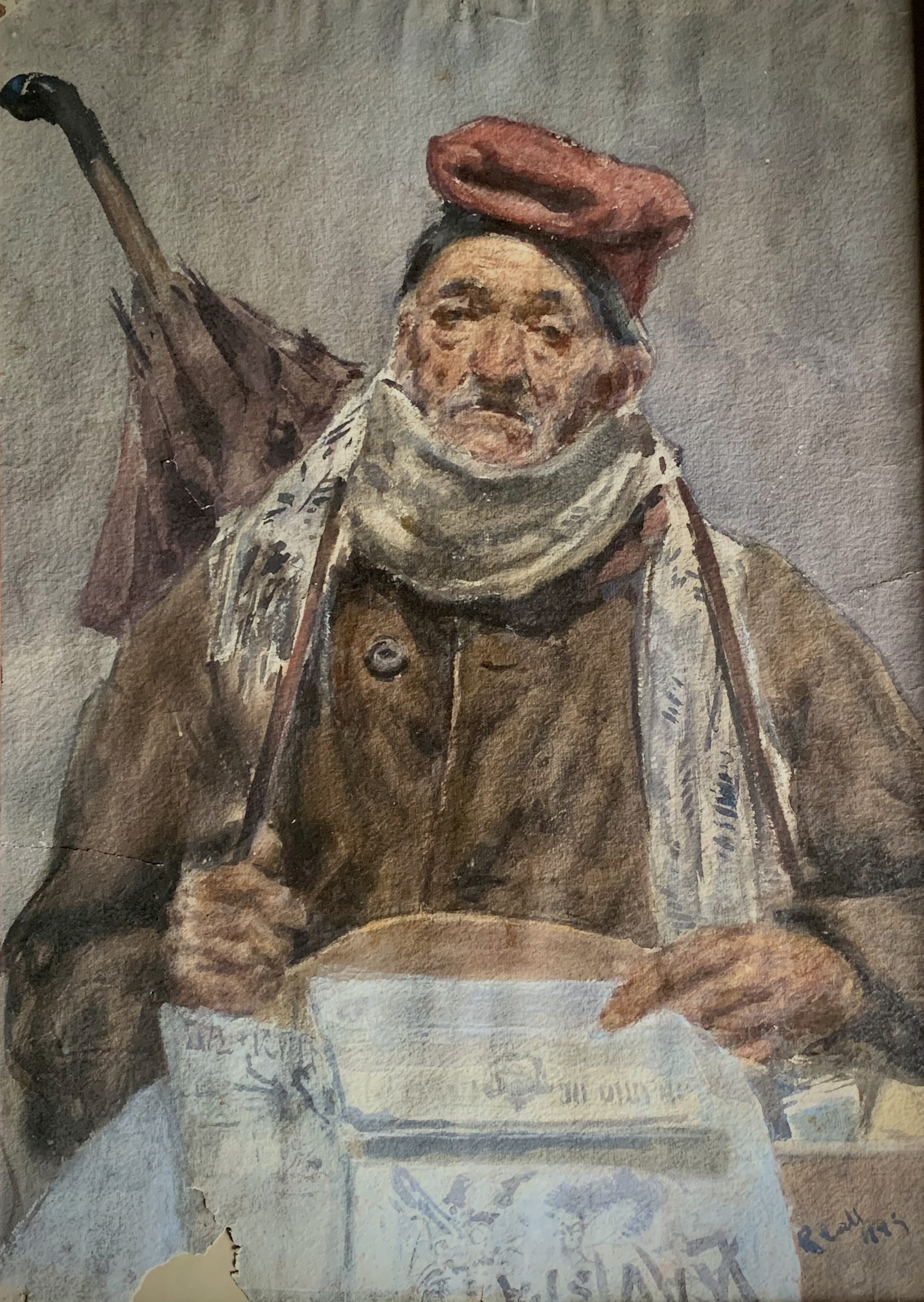
"The Newspaper Seller", unknown artist, 1885. Early social and symbolic Catalan independence painting

Painter Salvador Dalí sometimes wore the barretina in the 20th century. Some Catalan folkloric characters also wear a barretina, as: the Catalan Christmas figurine caganer, the Christmas log or tió, as well as the fictional characters Patufet, first drawn on the En Patufet magazine by Antoni Muntanyola, and "The Catalan" drawn by Gaietà Cornet i Palau.

== In popular culture ==
Moments before the 2010 FIFA World Cup Final between Spain and the Netherlands, pitch invader Jimmy Jump rushed onto the field and attempted to place a barretina on the World Cup trophy before being apprehended by several security guards.

== Gallery ==
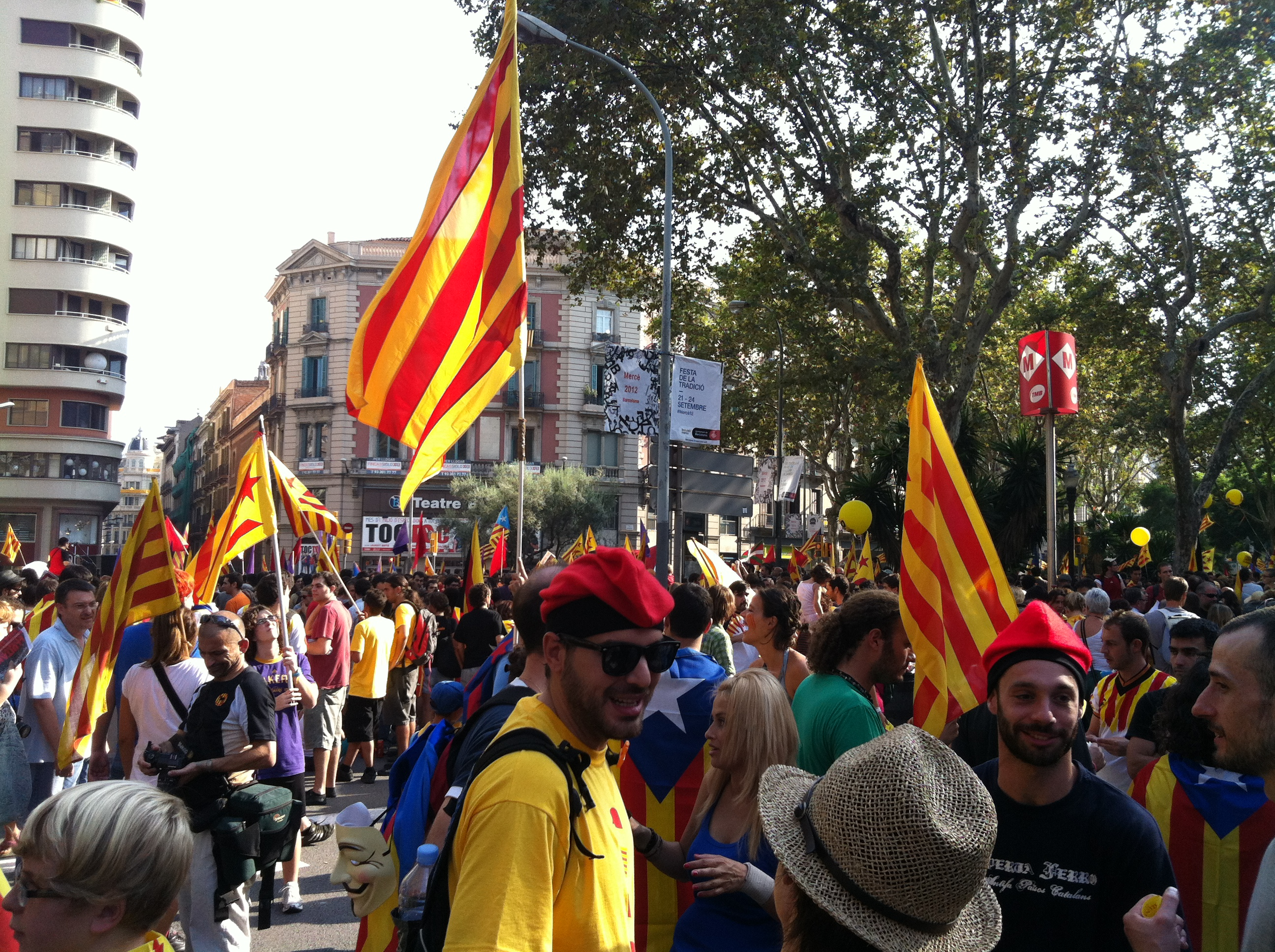
A Large group of Protesters wear Barretines and wave the Senyera at the 2012 Catalan Independence Protest

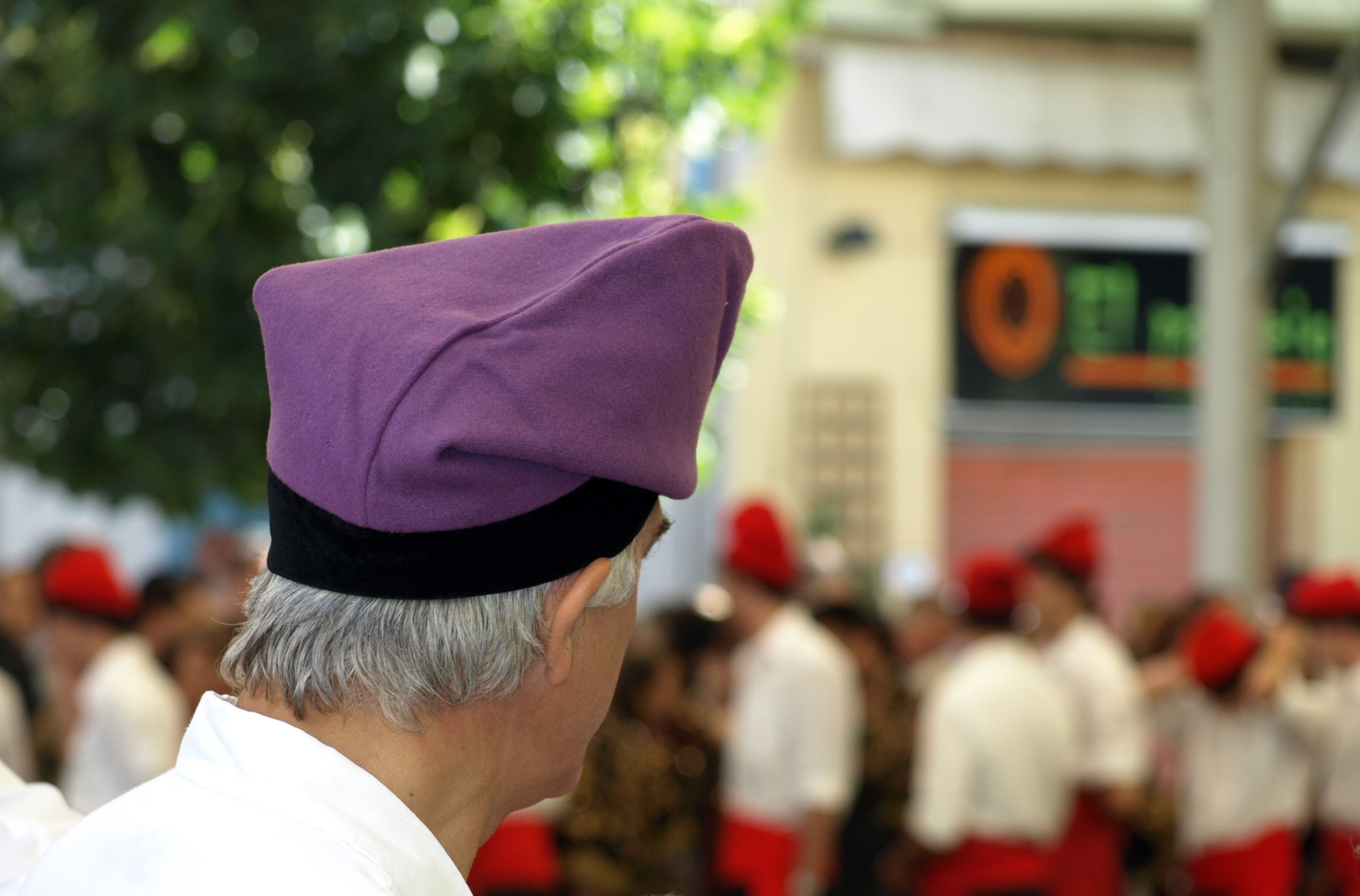
A Man is seen wearing a Musca Barretina

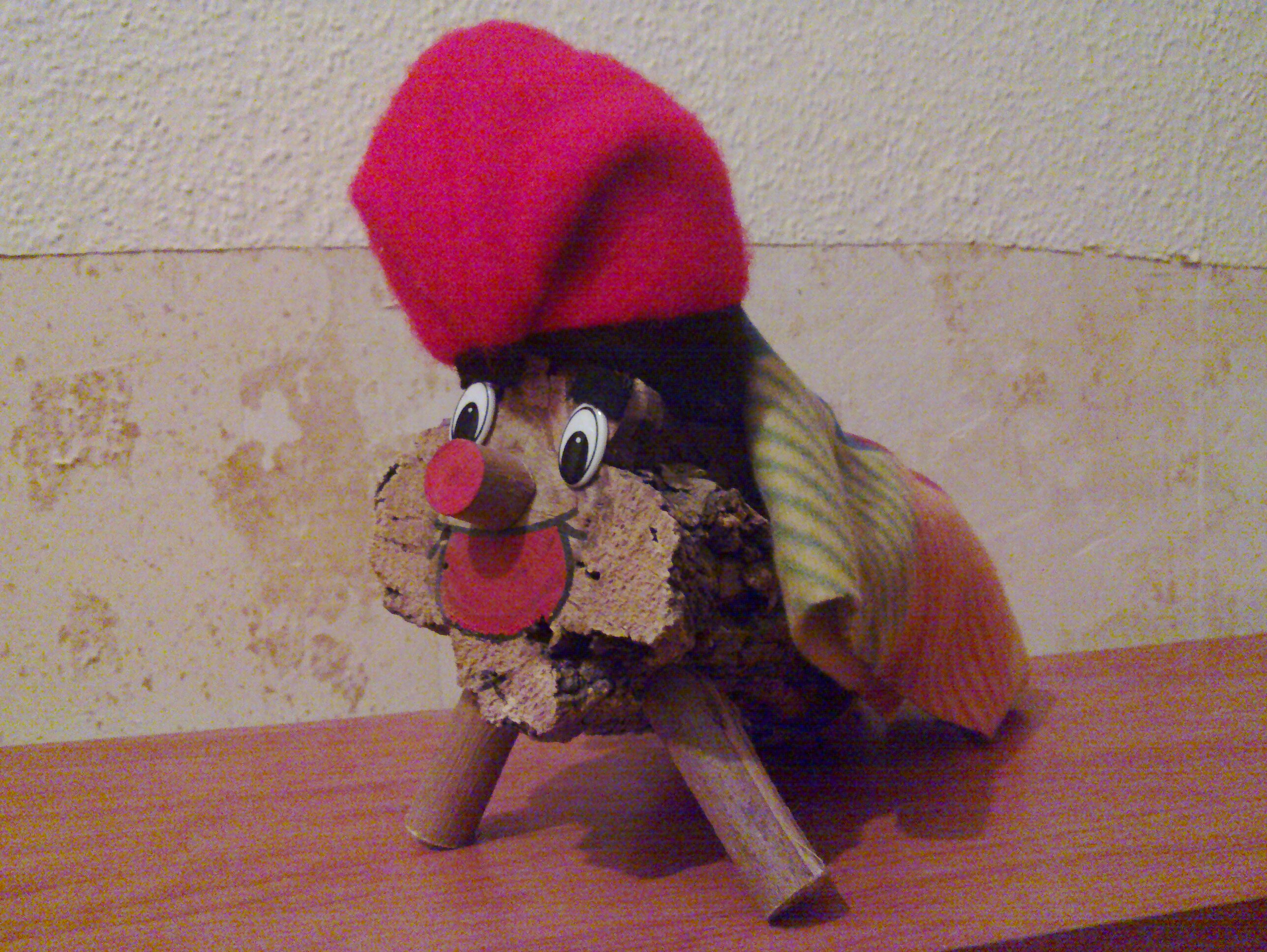
A Tió de Nadal (Christmas log) wears a Barretina

== See also ==
- List of hat styles
- Tuque
- Revolt of the Barretinas
- Phrygian cap
- Beret
