= Chabrot =

Occitanian culinary custom

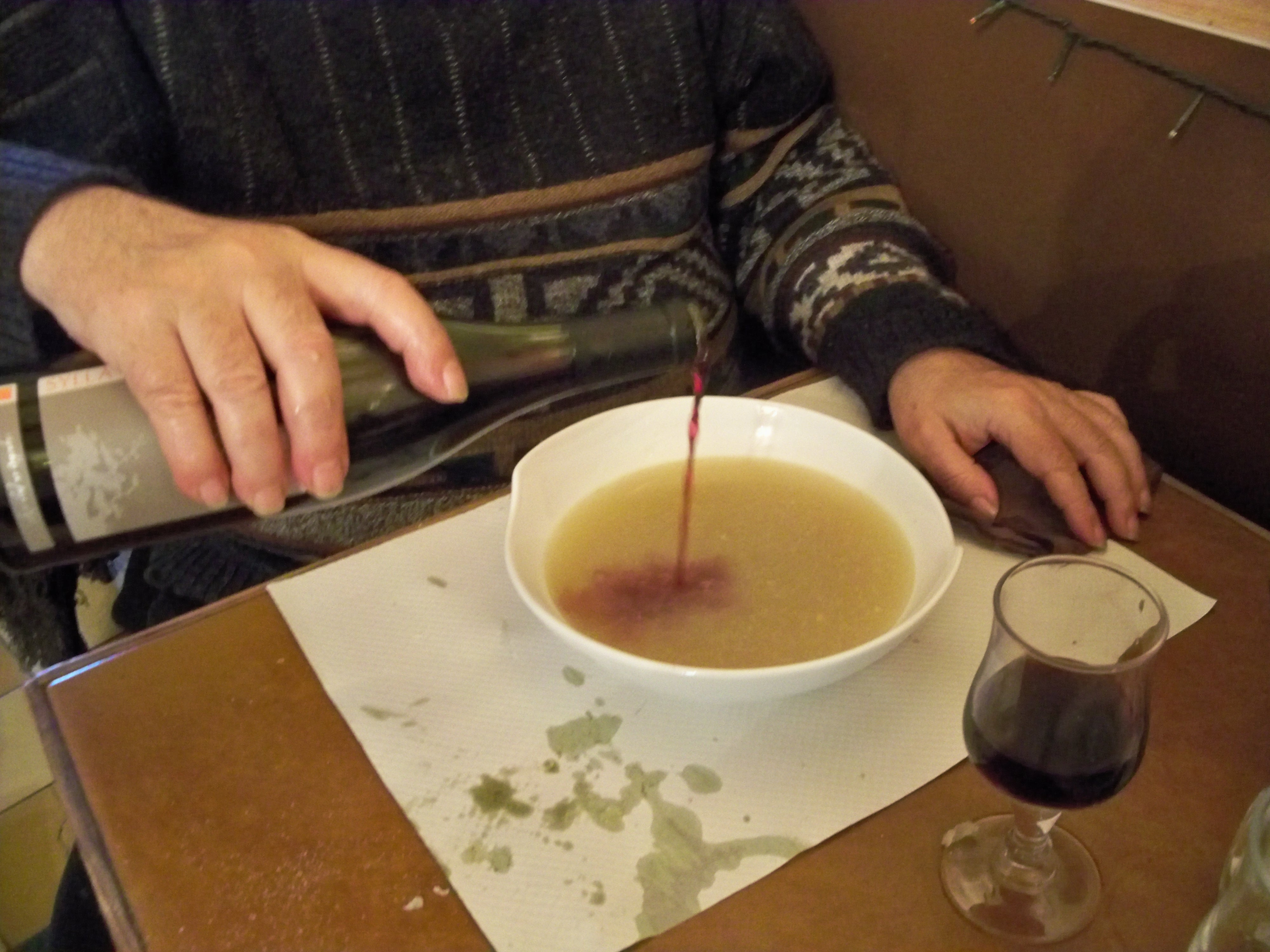
- Preparation of chabrot
- Alternative names: faire chabròl, fà chabroù, godala, godaille, goudale
- Course: at the end of the soup
- Region or state: Occitania
- Serving temperature: tepid, lukewarm
- Main ingredients: red wine in oily stock

Faire chabrot (Occitan pronunciation: [ˈfajɾe tʃaˈbɾut]) or faire chabròl (pronounced [... tʃaˈbɾɔl]) is an ancient Occitanian custom whereby at the end of a soup or broth, one adds red wine to the bowl to dilute the remnants and brings it to the lips to drink in large gulps. This practice was historically common in the countryside, and is still performed today, particularly among older people in the Southwest of France.

== History ==
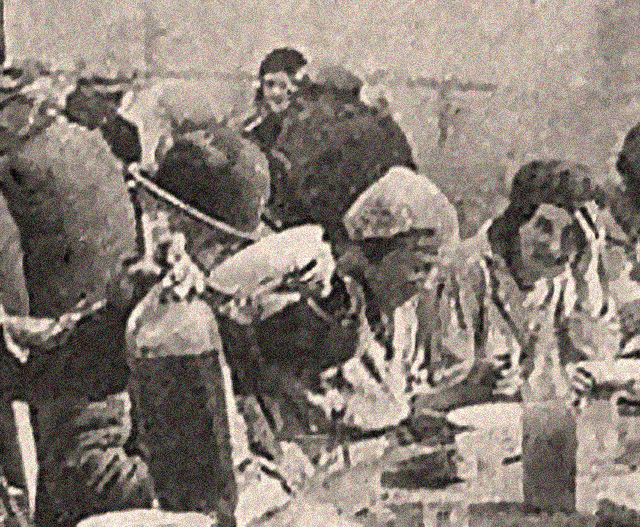
A grape picker from Provence performing chabrot

Chabrot was usually performed with soups such as bréjaude or garbure. This action required a traditional container used for serving soups, such as a deep, spherical bowl or dish. This container usually had no handles, was made of clay, in a dome form and somewhat narrow. This practice was very popular historically. It is still practised today notably among older people in the countryside.

People from Périgord perform fà chabroù, in Limousin one performs chabrot, while in Provence, Frédéric Mistral explains that cabroù comes from the Latin capreolus. To faire chabrot, therefore, is "to drink like a goat." In Poitou and in Saintonge, the word "godaille" is also used. In Gascon, they use the term godala (likely a metathesis of goulade, "gulp").

The practice may have arisen in places where food was scarce but wine was plentiful (and perhaps of low quality), as it ensures that essentially all the soup is consumed but some small amount of wine is likely to go to waste.

This practice appears to have existed north of the Loire: in the last volume of Chronique des Pasquier, Georges Duhamel writes of a longstanding practice, "It was a custom of my father," which was called champorot and was chabrot.

== Modern usage ==
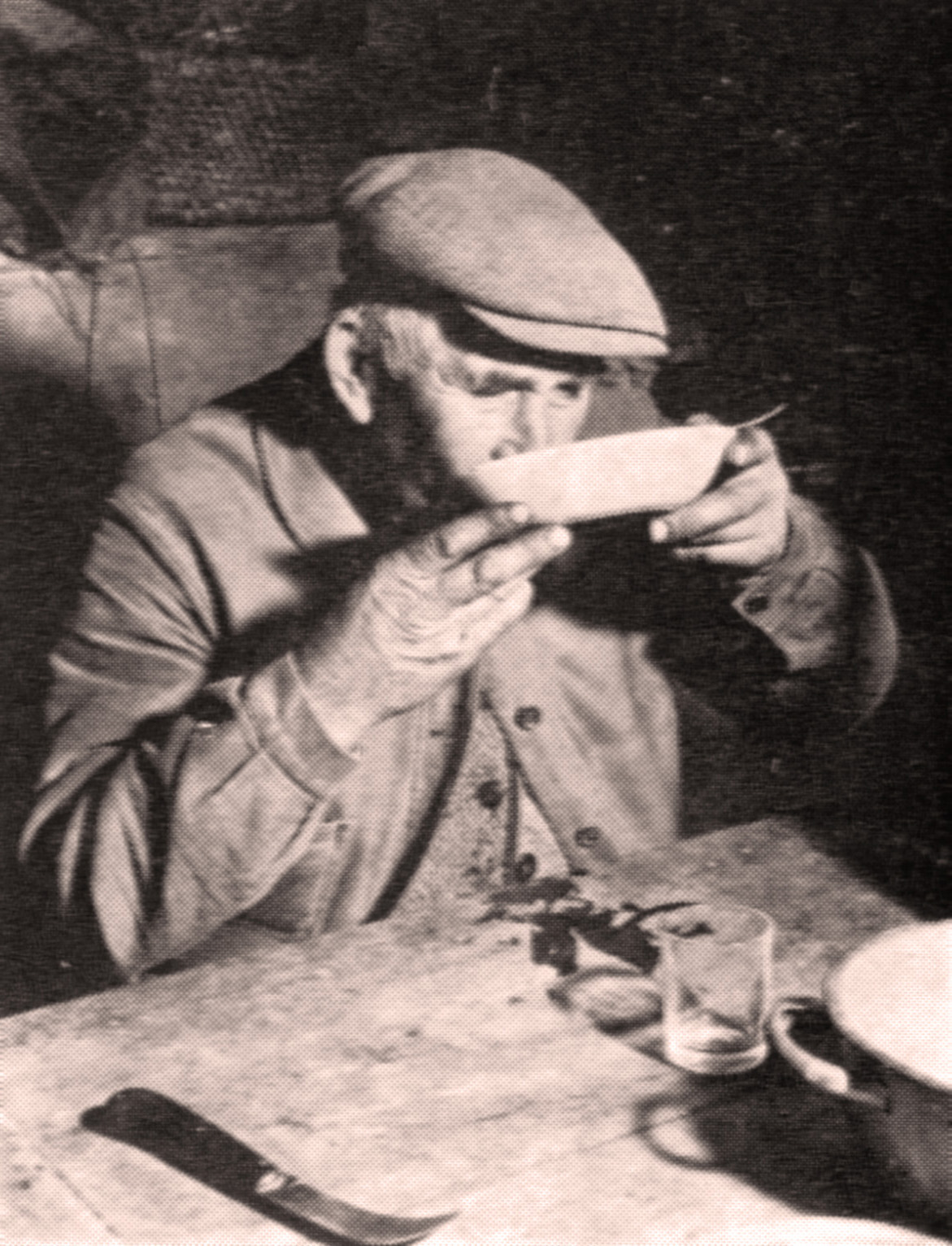
Chabrot in the past

Chabrot continues, notably in the Southwest of France. Jean Rebier (1879–1966), founder of the revue Lemouzi, describes the practice of chabrot as still relevant, "The soupe is regularly followed by a nice chabròl." Just as the ethnologist Albert Goursaud, deceased 1975, still talks about in the present, in his book The traditional rural society of Limousin: ethnography and folklore of Haut-Limousin and Basse-Marche published the year after his death. In his work, he distinguishes lost traditions from those that continued at the time he wrote it. Chabrot was performed commonly, at least in the countryside, just until the middle of the 20th century.

Catalan Jaume Fàbrega, born in 1948, indicates in Cuina del país dels càtars that while young, he witnessed at home lo cabròt. Roland Manoury, musicologist and poet of Auvergne, created a march of glory for chabrot that is traditionally accompanied by accordion. Its refrain asserts:

À la soupe! À la soupe!
Voici l'heure du chabrot.
Nous, on a le vin en poupe
Quand on a le bouillon tout chaud
On verse un' rasade
De vin rouge bien costaud.
Si, de plus on est malade
Pour guérir, faisons chabrot.

Translation:

To the soup! To the soup!
It's time for chabrot.
We have wine astern
When we have stock all hot
We pour a glassful
Of strong red wine
If, moreover we are sick
To recover, perform chabrot

Today, chabrot is considered an old and rural gesture, but on certain occasions it can be performed in all environments, in a spirit of conviviality and friendliness. During a meal between gastronomists, Philippe Faure-Brac, best sommelier (wine steward) in the world in 1992, owner of « Bistrot du Sommelier » in Paris, and member of GJE, rose and asked for permission to perform chabrot with the rest of his cream of mushroom soup and some 1998 Cheval Blanc. Pierre Lurton, director of the societies of châteaus of Yquem and Cheval Blanc, replied by pouring the bottom of his glass into the soup. Everyone did the same. This modern version of chabrot consisted of tasting the mixture with a spoon, but no one drank directly from the dish.

Chabrot in the old days

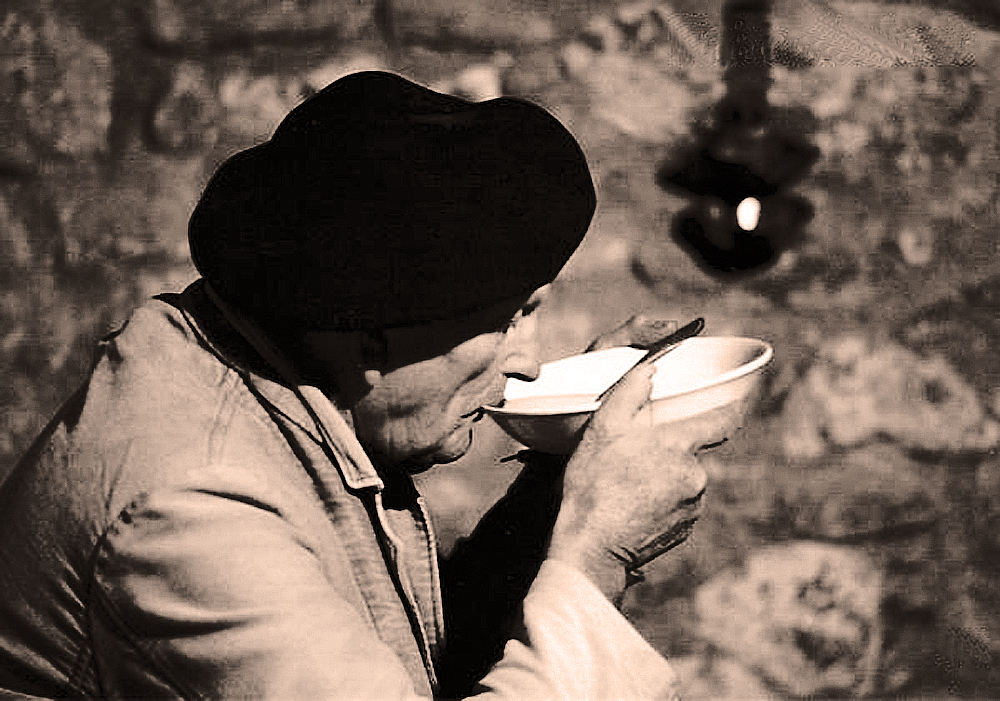
Chabrot in the Baronnies

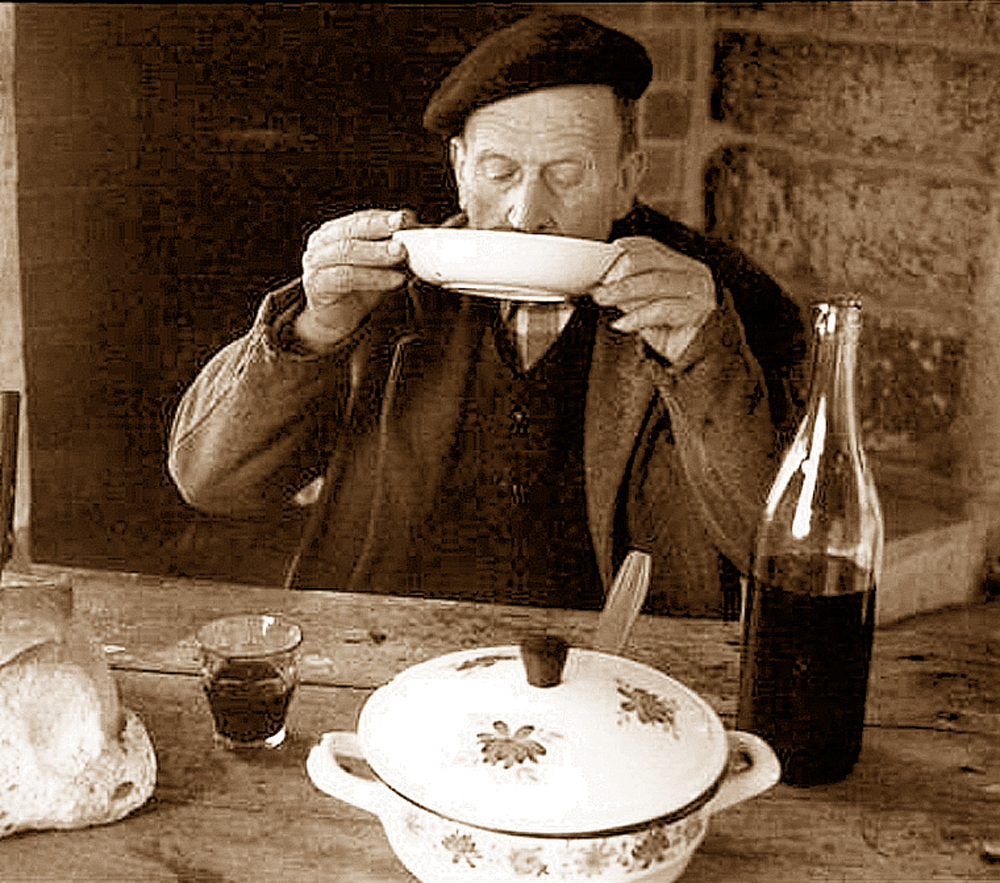
Chabrot in the Alpes-de-Haute-Provence

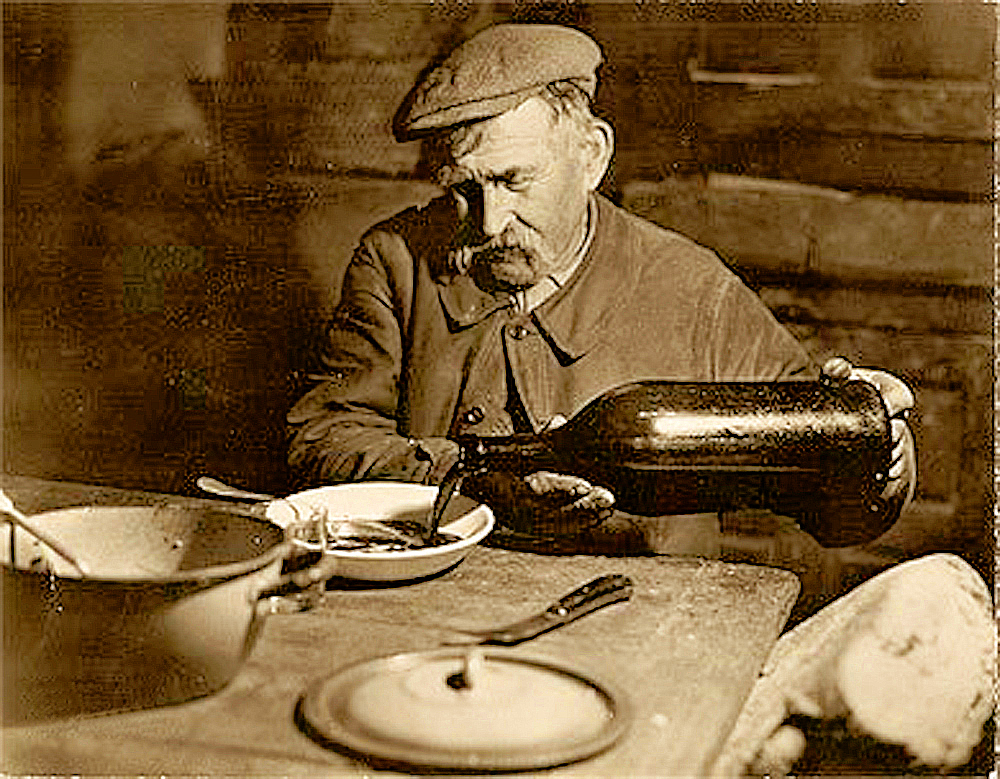
Chabrot in Ardèche

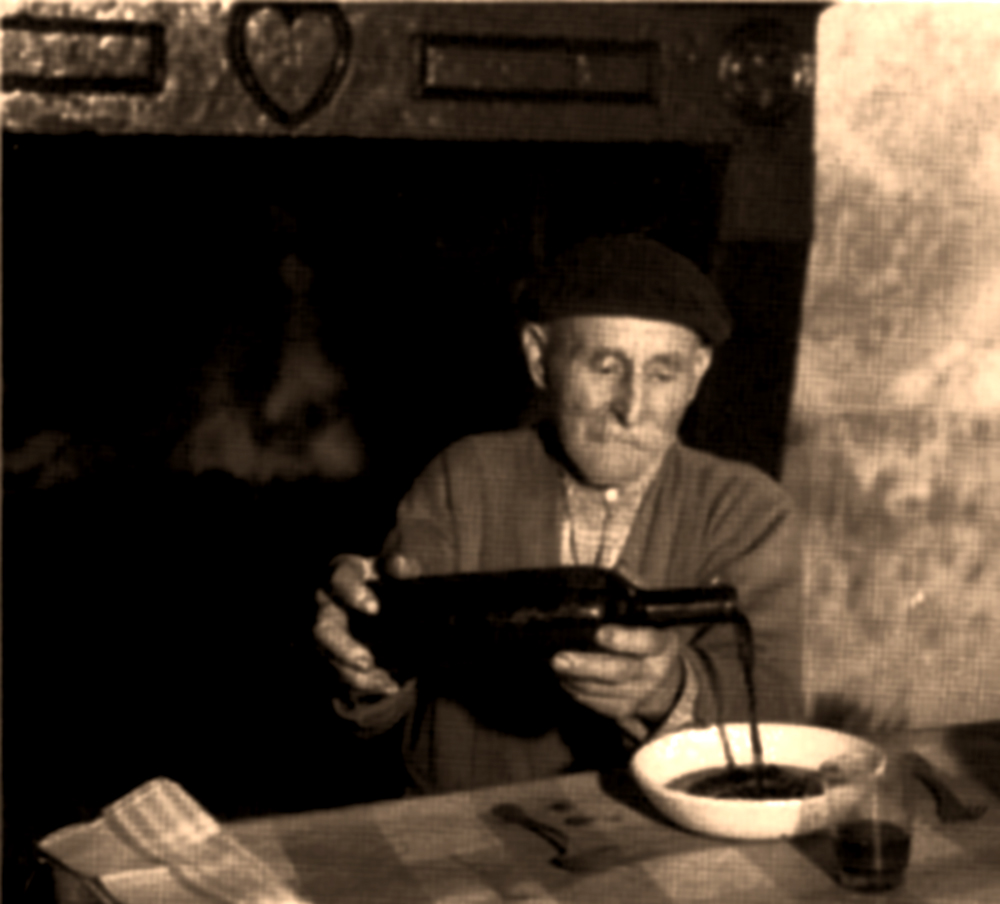
Chabrot in the Hautes-Alpes

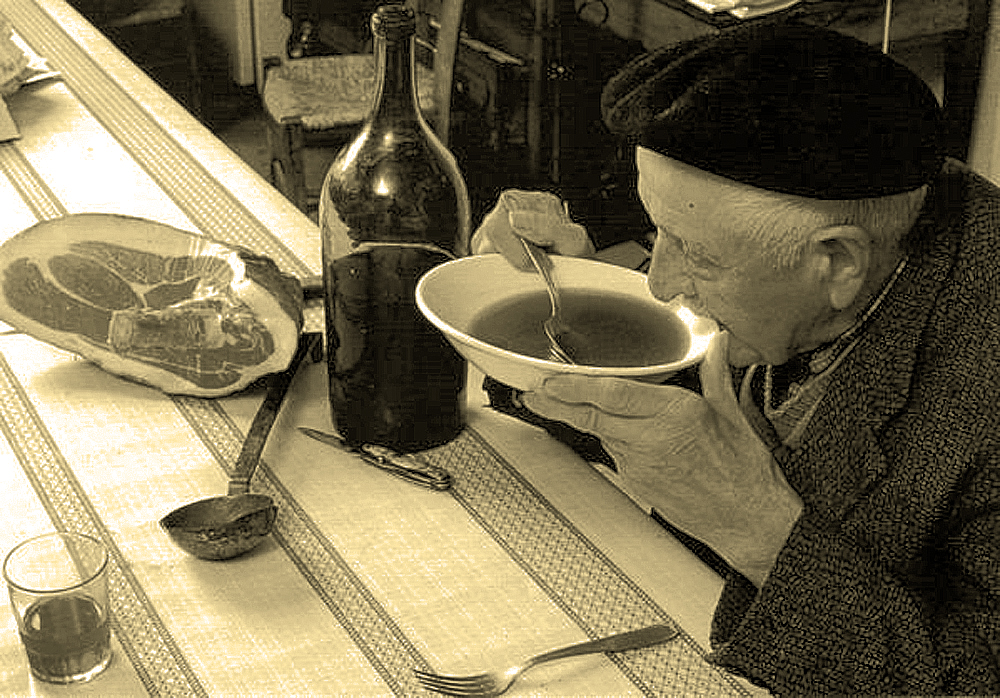
Chabrot in the Cévennes
Chabrot nowadays

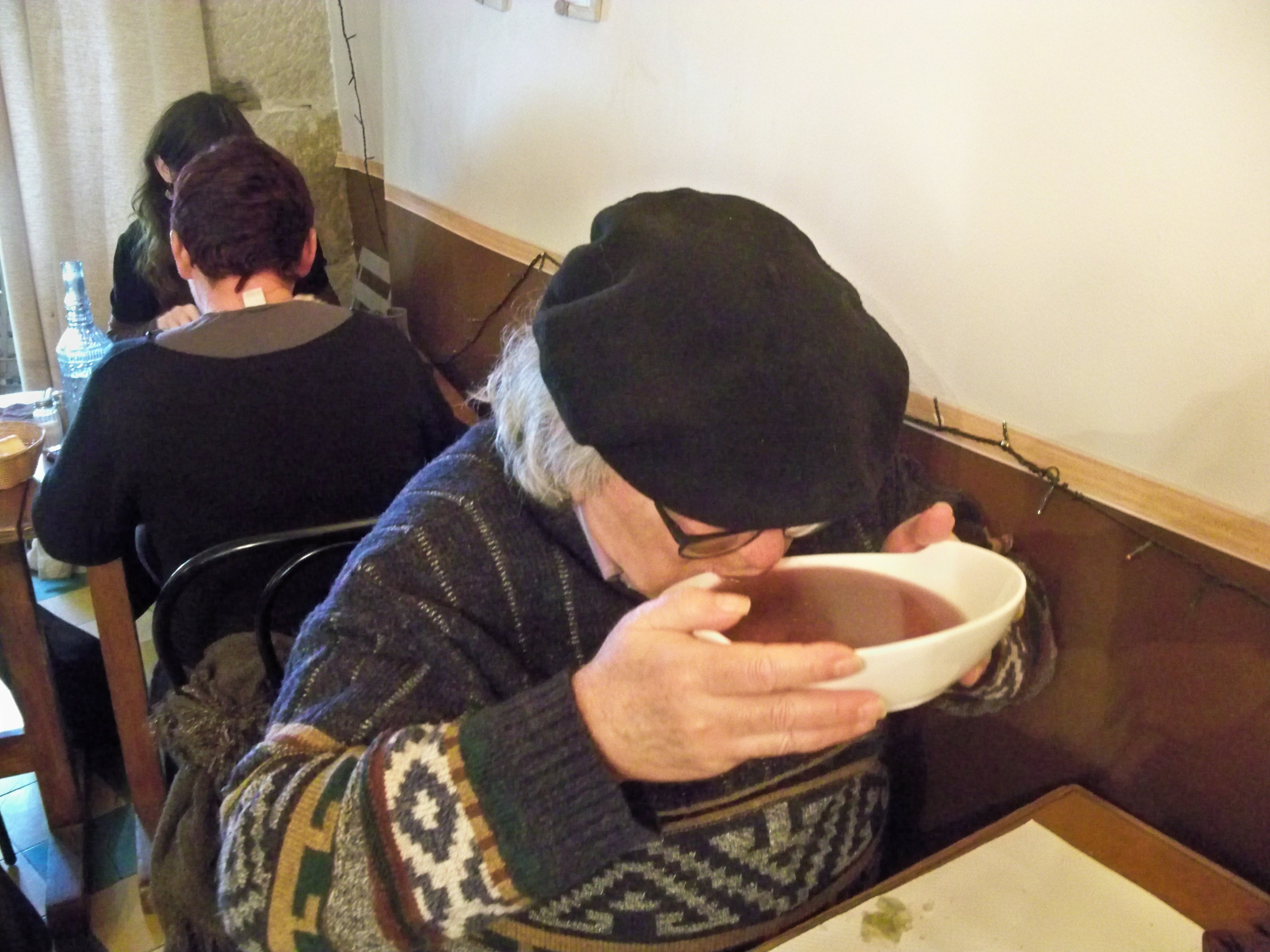
Chabrot in a bar

== See also ==
- The dictionary definition of chabrot at Wiktionary
