= Pa amb tomàquet =

Traditional food of Catalonia

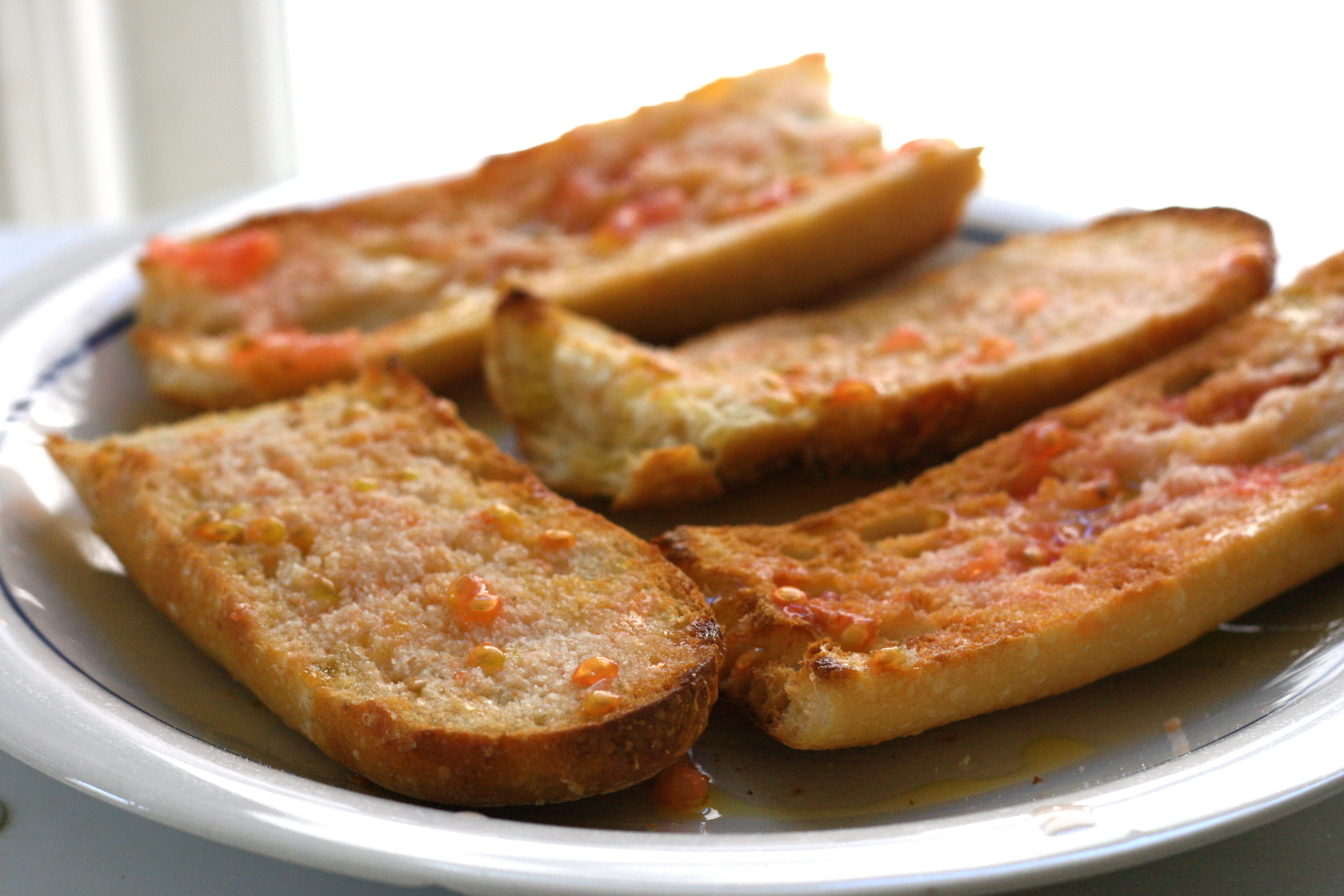
- Pa amb tomàquet
- Alternative names: Pa amb tomaca, Pa amb tomata
- Type: Snack, dish, sandwich
- Place of origin: Catalan Countries
- Region or state: Catalonia, Northern Catalonia, Balearic Islands, Valencia, Aragon
- Invented: 1800s
- Main ingredients: Bread (preferably toasted pa de pagès type), fresh rubbed tomato, olive oil, salt
- Variations: Optional rubbed garlic

Pa amb tomàquet (Catalan pronunciation: [ˈpa m tuˈmakət]), also known as pa amb tomata or pa amb tomaca (all meaning "bread with tomato" in Catalan), is a traditional food of Catalan (including Northern Catalonia in France), Balearic and, to a lesser extent, Valencian and Aragonese cuisine. Pa amb tomàquet is considered a staple of Catalonia's cuisine and Catalan national identity.

It consists of bread, which may or may not be toasted, topped with fresh rubbed-in tomato over the surface and seasoned with olive oil and salt, with optional rubbed garlic. It is sometimes used as a vessel for cured ham or other types of cured meats and cheese.

It is considered one of the typical examples that define the Mediterranean diet, extended as a traditional recipe throughout the Catalan Countries, and its preparation has become an iconic ritual of Western Mediterranean culture.

It is popularly consumed on its own as a snack, as sandwich or a tapa with any meal, from breakfast to dinner.

== Preparation ==
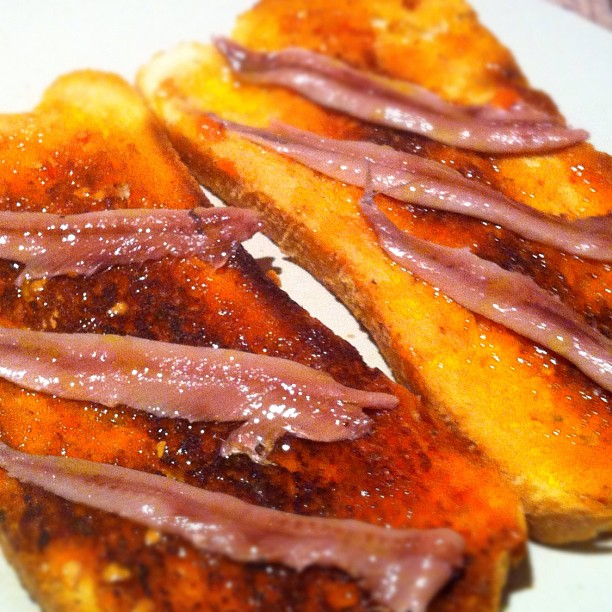
Pa amb tomàquet with anchovies

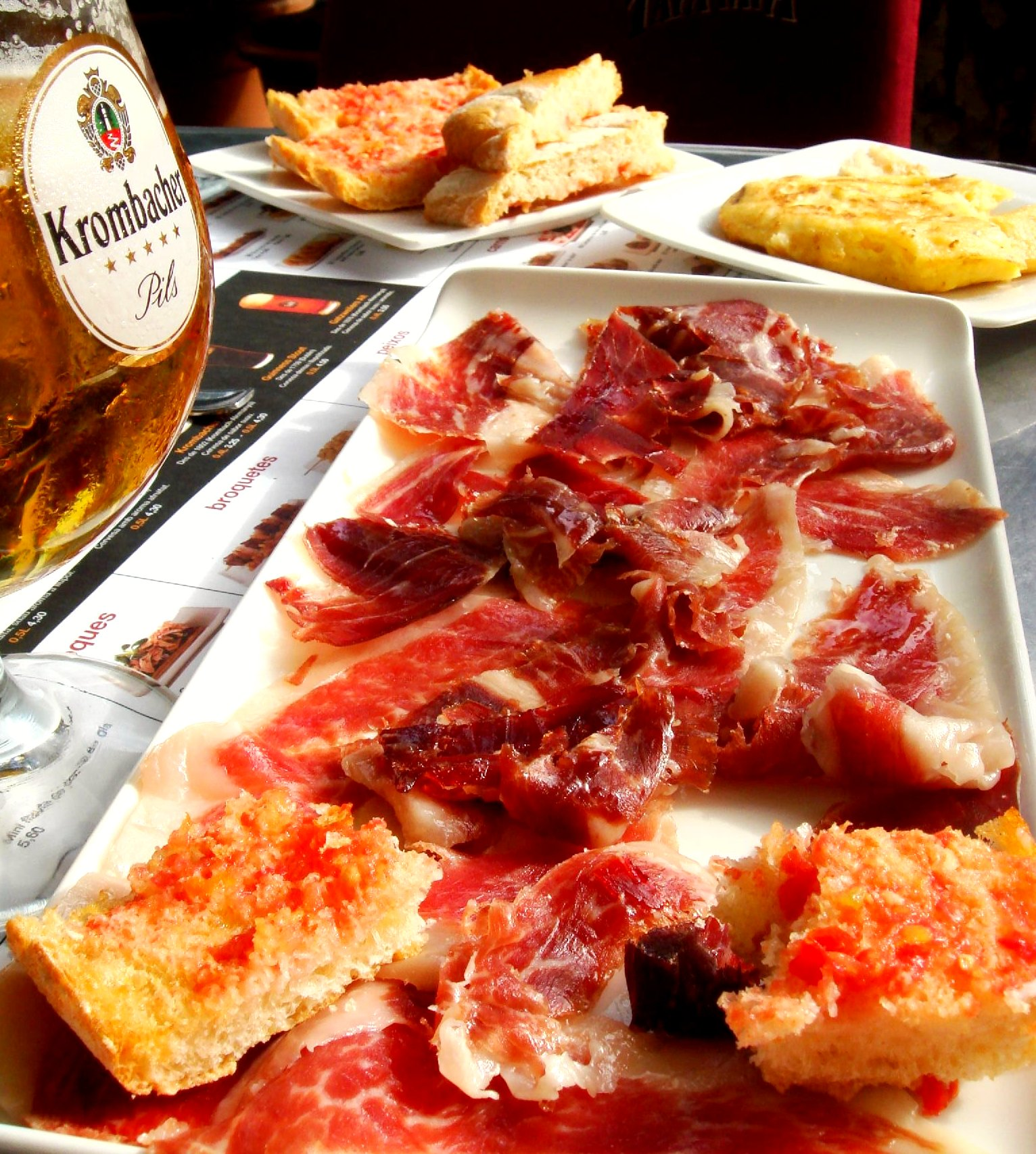
With jamón ibérico

In some restaurants, the tomato is spread on the bread, while others provide the guests with the ingredients to do the work themselves. The dish is served accompanied with any sorts of sausages (such as cured botifarres, xoriço, fuet, Iberian ham, or others), ham, cheeses, omelettes, anchovies or other marinated fish, or grilled vegetables like escalivada.

In Mallorca, pa amb oli ("bread with oil") is prepared with tomato called Tomàtiga de Ramellet, a specific variety of vine tomatoes, smaller and with a taste that is slightly more intense and sour than normal tomatoes due to the loss of acidity in the tomato.

The original base used to be made with toasted slices of pa de pagès ("farmer's bread"), a typical round loaf of wheat bread of a fair size (from 500 to 5,000 g or 1 to 11 lb, from some 20 to 50 cm or 8 to 20 in in diameter).

If the mixture is not pre-made, there is said to be an ideal order in which the ingredients are integrated to yield the best flavour. First, if used, the garlic is rubbed on the bread. Then the same is done with the tomato. Next comes the salt, and lastly the olive oil.

== History ==
The origin of this dish is disputed, as tomato is relatively new to Catalan cuisine (it came from America only after the 15th century). Widely regarded as the epitome of Catalan cuisine and identity, some sources claim it is actually a relatively recent (mid to late 19th century) in all the Mediterranean coast of Spain.

Catalan chef Josep Lladonosa i Giró says it was first documented in the 18th century. The cook, born in 1938, remembers his grandmother explaining that her parents used to eat a dish called pa amb tomàquet. With better precision, Catalan cooking historian Nèstor Luján says that the first written reference is from 1884 and, according to his thesis, the recipe would have been created in the rural world during an abundant tomato harvest. People would have used the tomatoes to soften hard and dry bread.

The dish shares some similarities with the tomato and olive oil-rubbed ħobż biz-Zejt of Malta, with the pan-bagnat of Nice, in the Provence region of France, the tomato-topped version of Italian bruschetta.

== Gallery ==
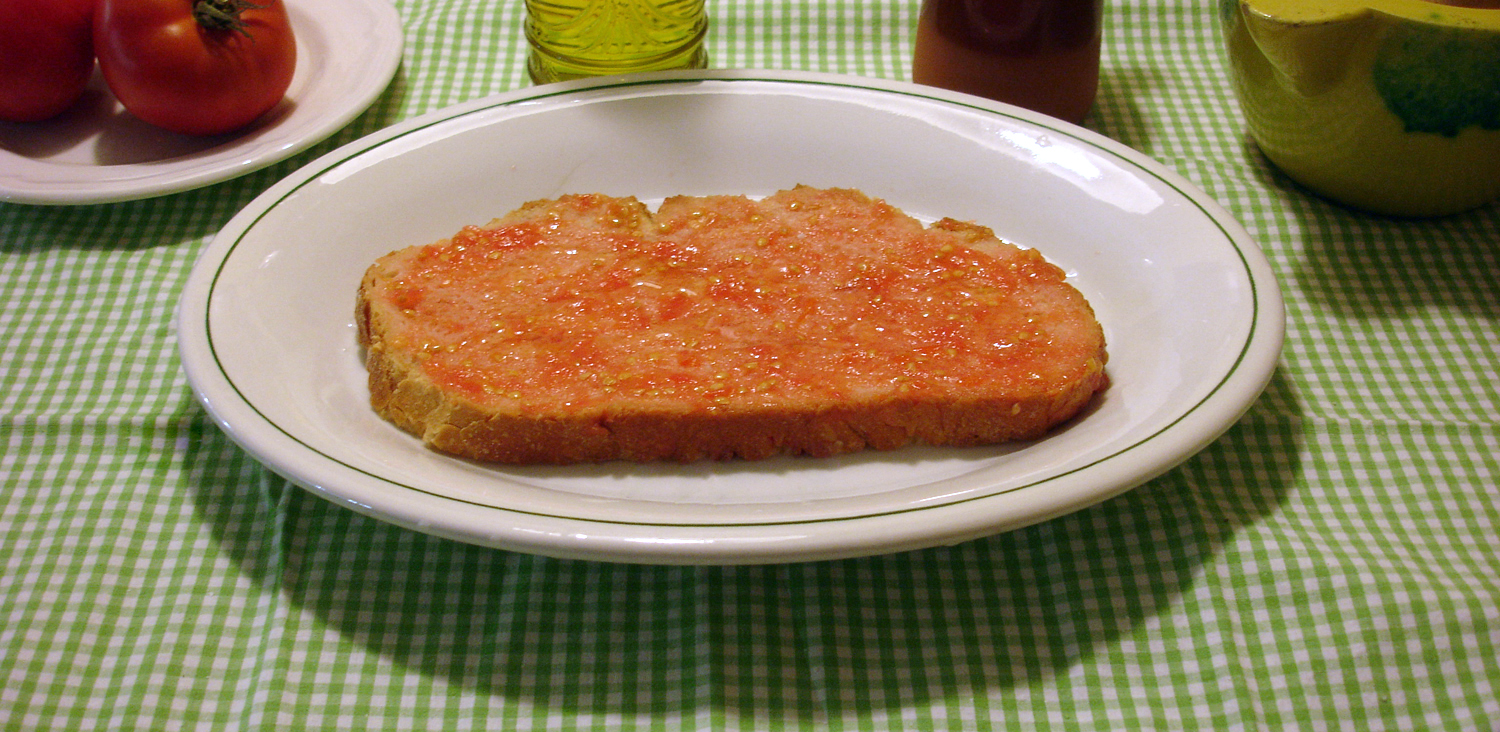
Pa amb tomàquet

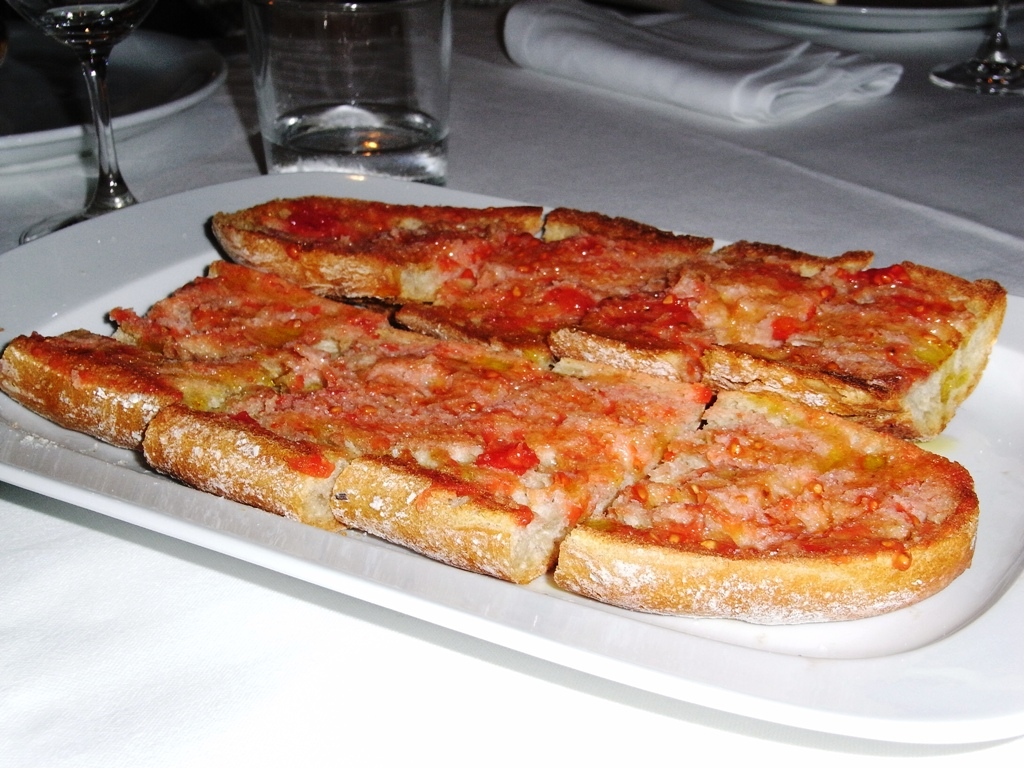
Tray of pa amb tomàquet

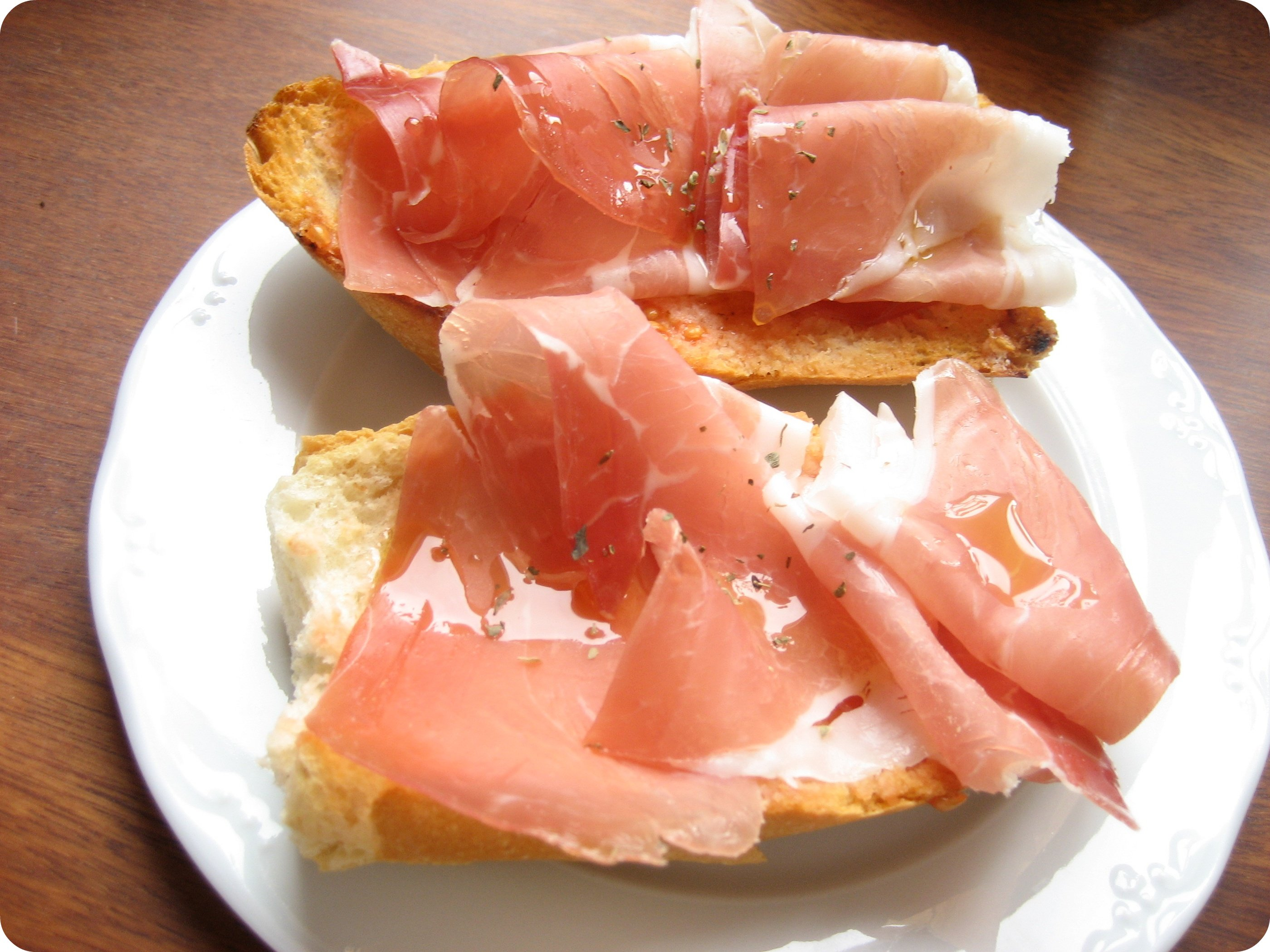
With ham (pernil)

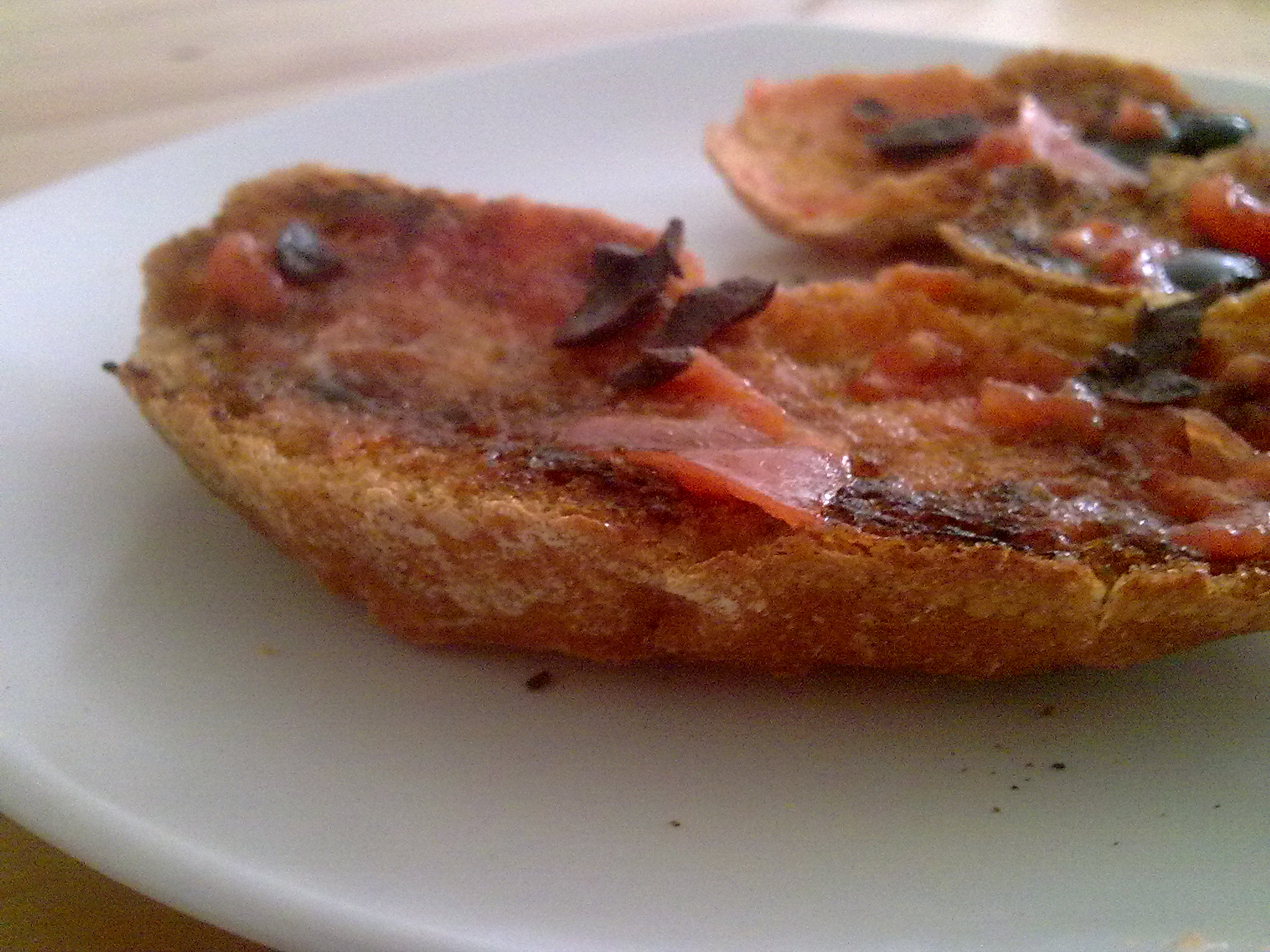
With olives

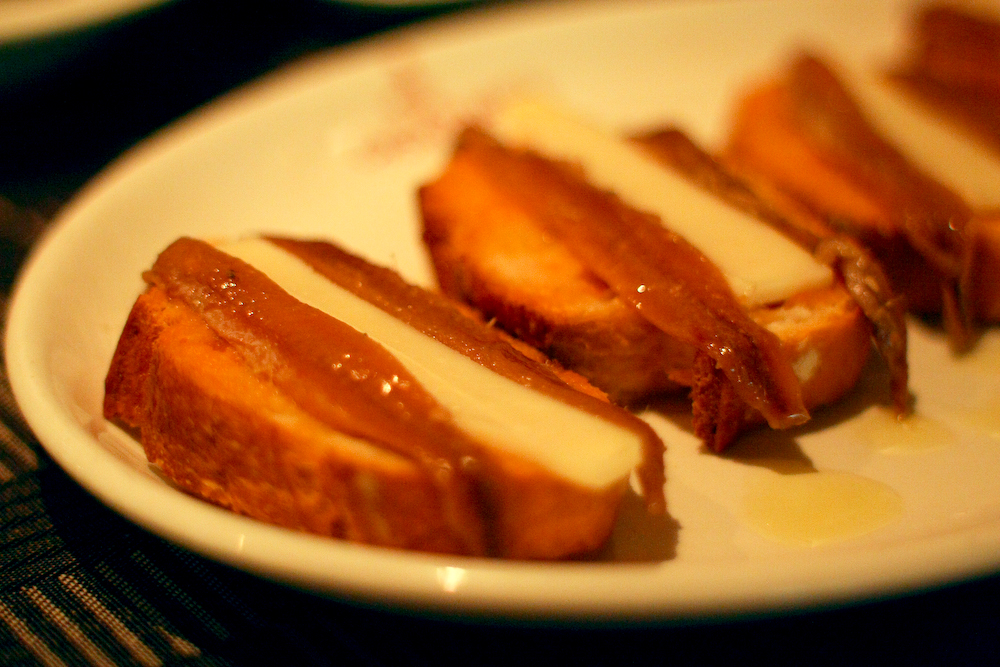
With anchovies

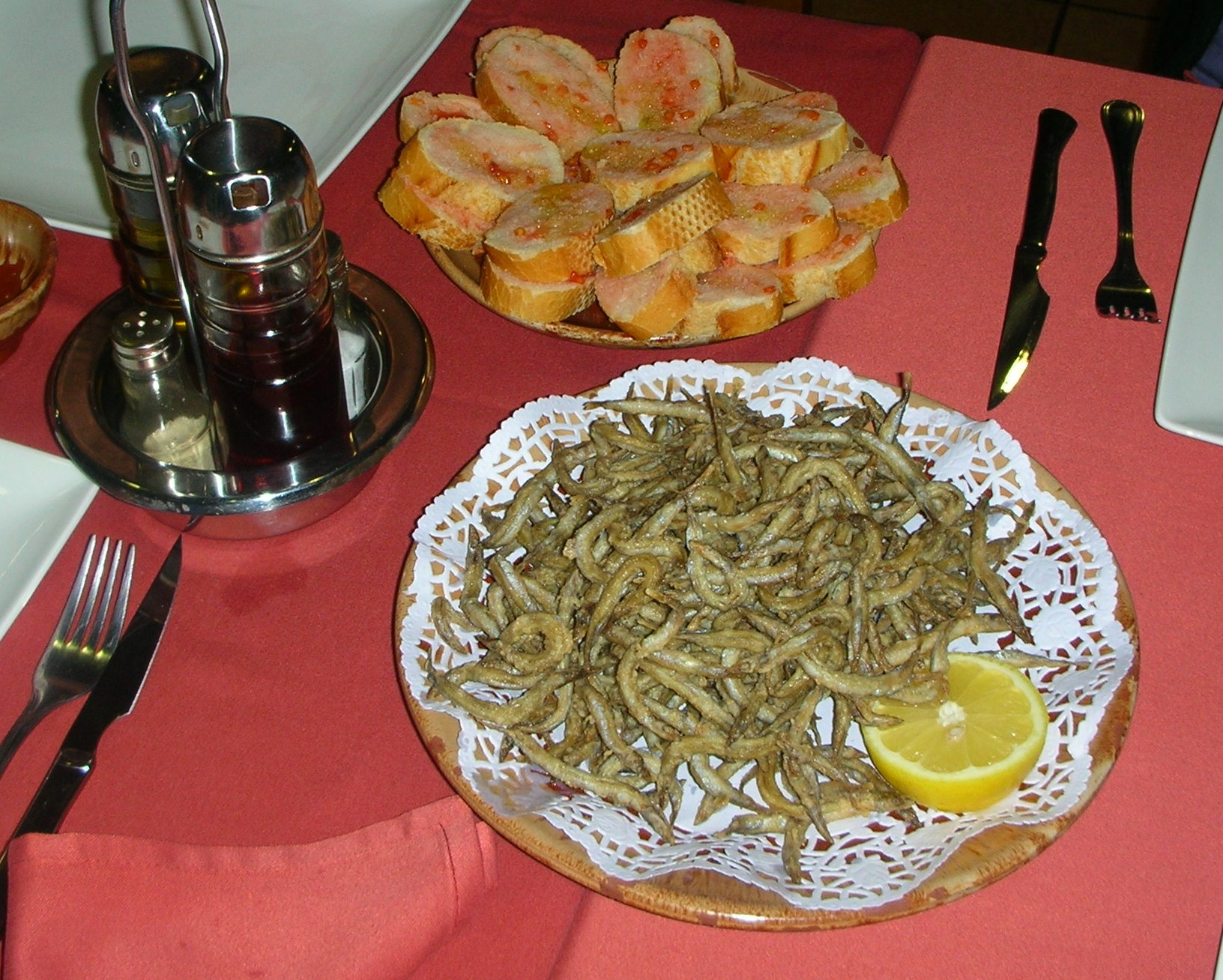
Fried sonsos with pa amb tomàquet

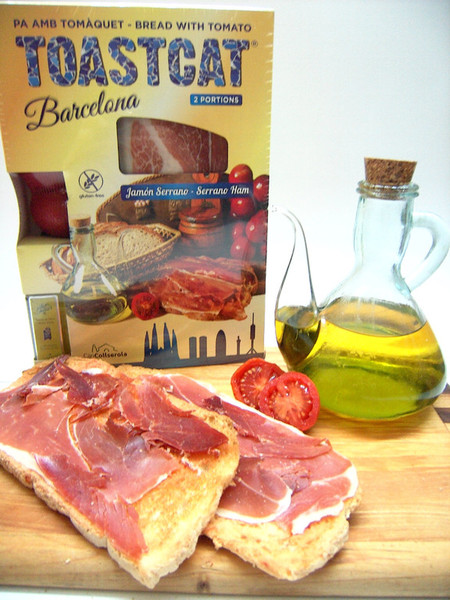
Pa amb tomàquet packaged kit

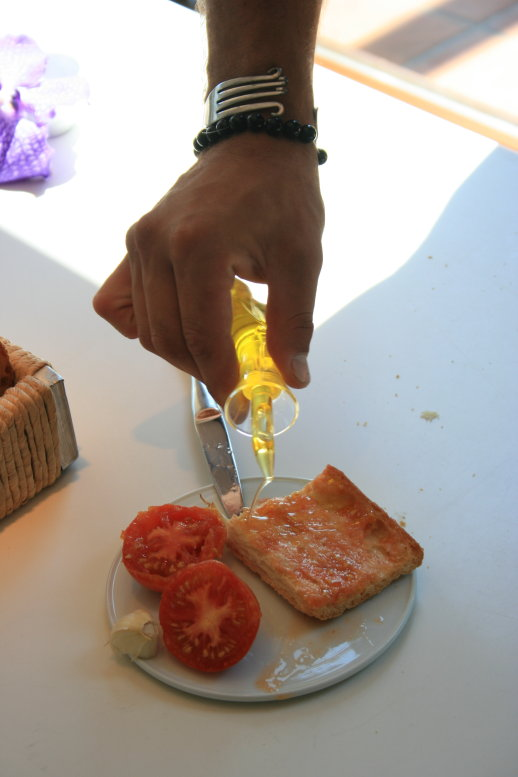
Adding olive oil

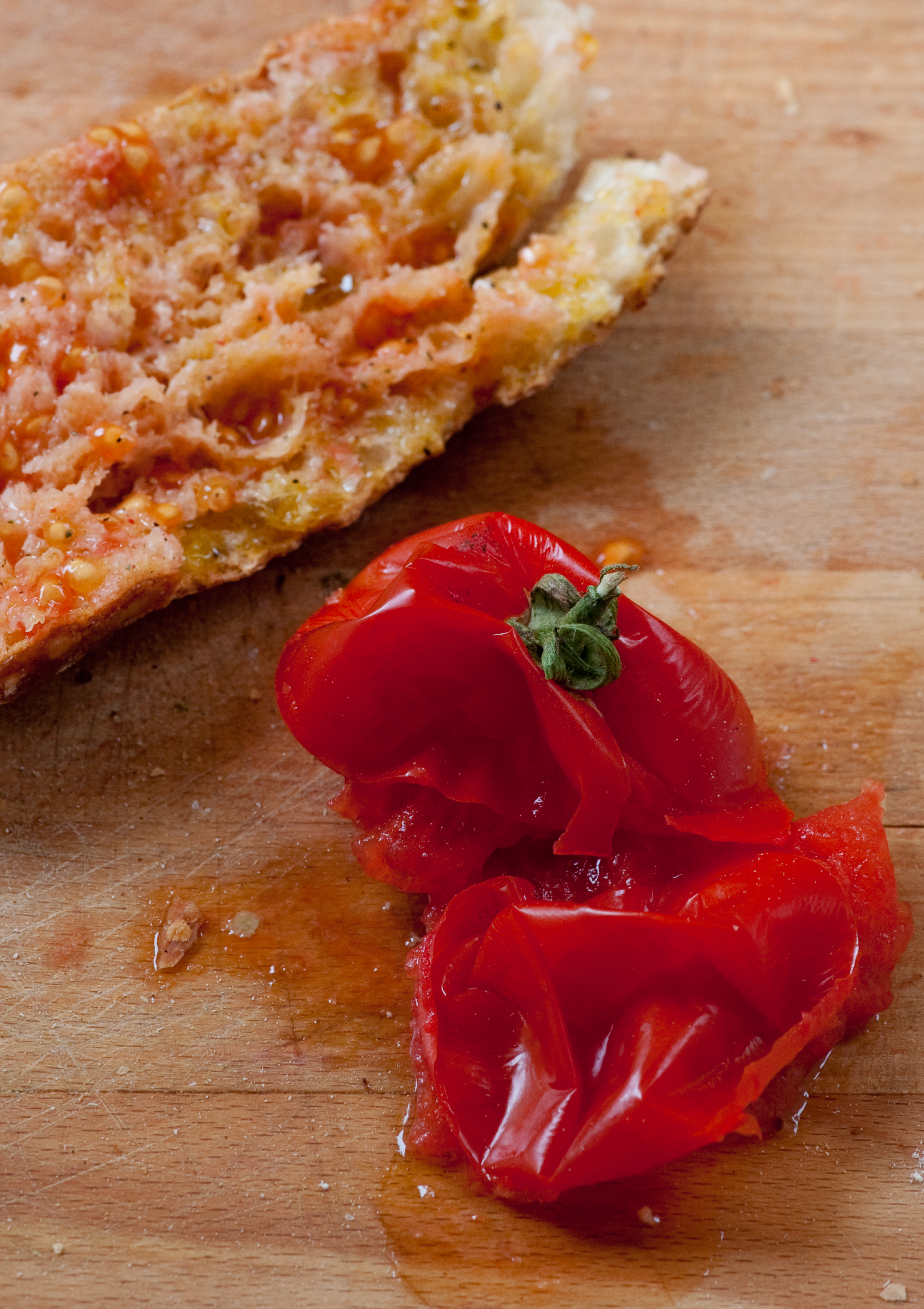
Squeezed tomato after use

== See also ==
- List of bread dishes
- List of toast dishes
