= Pa de pagès =

Traditional food of Catalonia

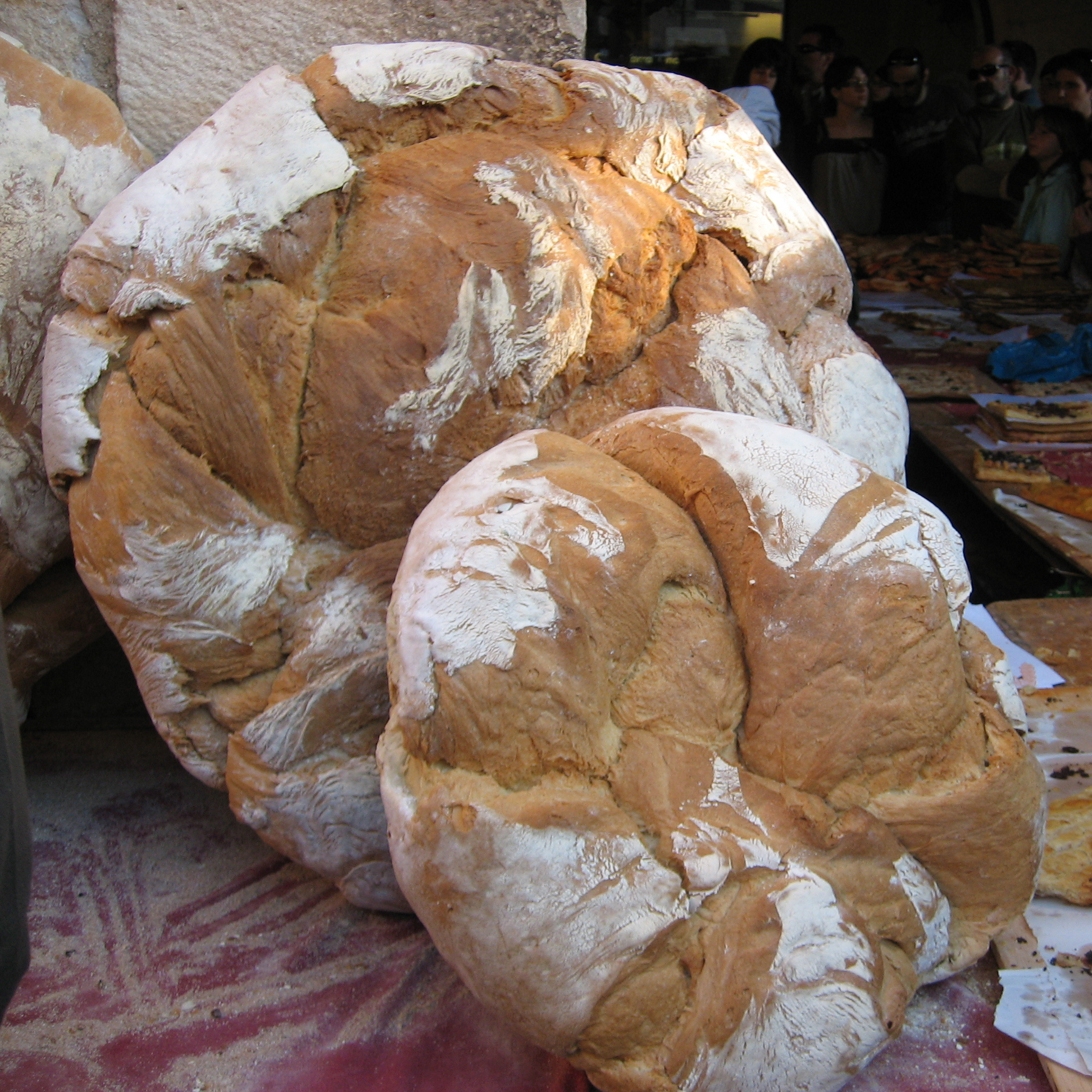
- Pa de pagès
- Type: Bread
- Place of origin: Catalonia
- Region or state: Catalan countries
- Main ingredients: Flour, yeast, water

Pa de pagès (Catalan pronunciation: [ˈpa ðə pəˈʒɛs]; "farmer's bread" in Catalan) is a type of traditional bread from Catalan cuisine. It is made in an artisanal manner and baked in a refractory oven, giving it a thick crust, which helps keep the inside fresh and soft for a long period of time. Its fat content is lower than that of regular bread. "Pa de pagès" has a round shape and is usually sold in 250-gram, half-kilo, or two-kilo formats. It can be bought whole or sliced and it is commonly used to prepare pa amb tomàquet.

== Name ==
The name pa de pagès is thought to have originated in Barcelona at the end of the nineteenth and beginning of the twentieth centuries, during the rural exodus. Bakers are believed to have started calling this traditional Catalan round bread pa de pagès in order to differentiate it from other, more industrial types of bread that had become popular at the time.

== PGI Pa de Pagès Català ==
Since 20 February 2013, pa de pagès made in Catalonia has been certified with a Protected Geographical Indication (PGI) under file number PGI-ES-0880. It is defined as a traditional, round bread with a crisp crust, soft crumb, and large air pockets, where at least the shaping is done by hand. The bread must ferment for at least three hours and must be baked in an oven with refractory base.

The Catalan Federation of Bakers’ Guild Associations (Federació Catalana d'Associacions de Gremis de Flequers) promoted the creation of the Protected Geographical Indication Pa de Pagès Català in October 2010. On 20 February 2013, the European Commission published a regulation declaring the inclusion of Pa de Pagès Català in the list of Protected Geographical Indications.

== See also ==
- Pa amb tomàquet
- List of breads
