= Jaume Fàbrega =

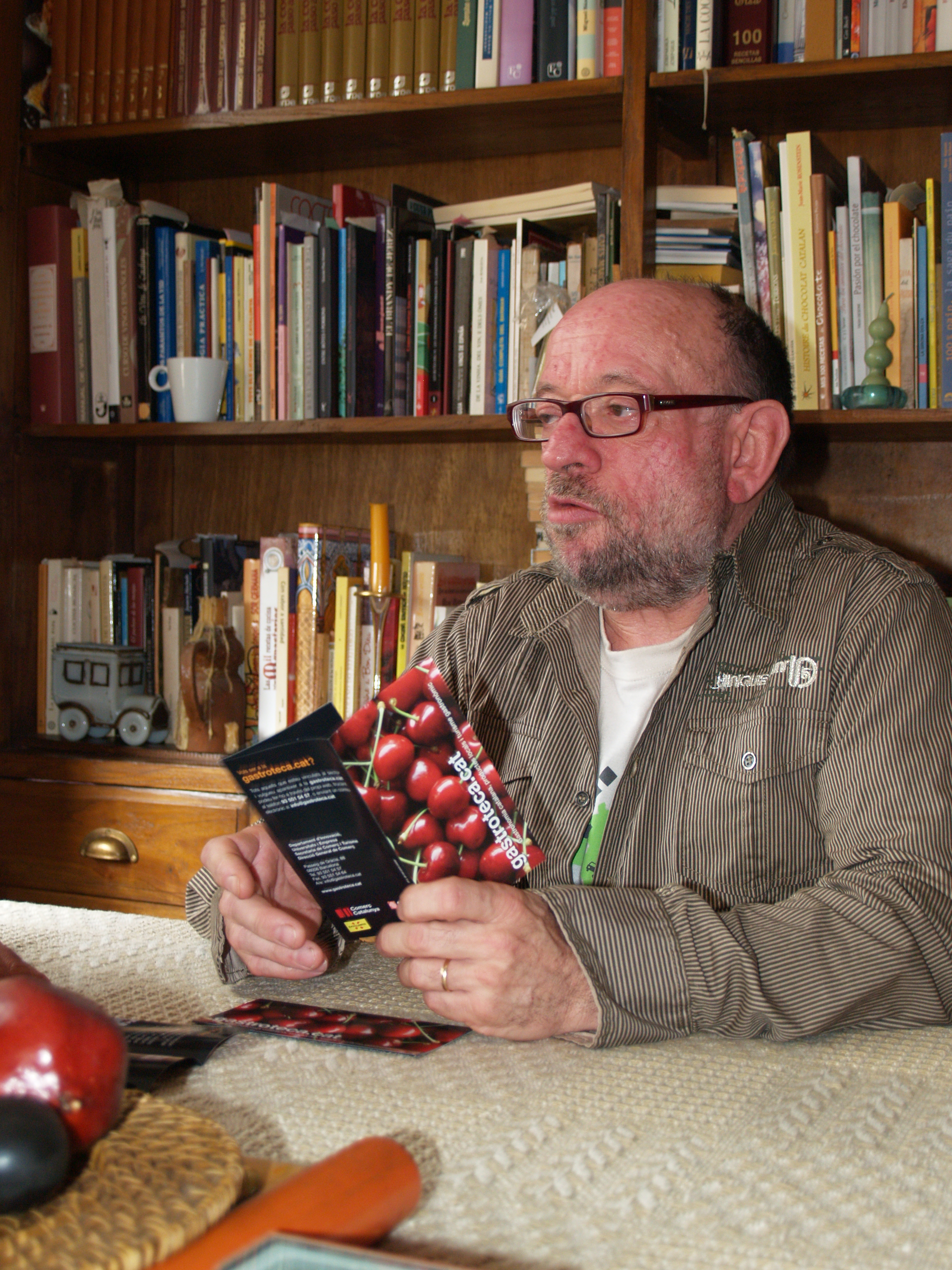
Jaume Fàbrega

Jaume Fábrega Colón (Fontcoberta, Girona, 1948) is a Spanish gastronomy writer, journalist, historian and professor. He has written more than fifty gastronomy and cooking books, and has won the Gourmand World Cookbook Award five times. He is involved in some international cultural associations including AICA and FIJET.

He has worked as journalist for newspapers in Catalonia and Spain, including La Vanguardia, Avui, El Temps, El Món, El Punt, and Diari de Girona, as well as for radio stations such as Catalunya Ràdio.

He has written encyclopedias of gastronomy which have been translated into English and other languages. His books include La cuina, Gastronomia tradicional sana, and La cuina catalana. He has also worked as an editor on multiple books, including for Josep Lladonosa's El Gran Llibre de la Cuina Catalana and Ferran Adrià's El Bulli, El sabor del Mediterráneo.

== Awards and honors ==
- Robert de Nola 1981, with Jean-François Revel
- Chaîne des Rôtisseurs 1987
- Jaume Ciurana 1987 of journalism
- Raïm d'Argent 1991 with Juan Maria Arzak
- Premi Nacional d'Assaig of Andorra 1996 and 2007
- Josep Vallverdú 1996
- Rovira i Virgili 1999
- C. Sarthou 2007
- His books have been selected to be exposed in the Olympic International Exposition of Cooking Books of Beijing (China) 2007
- He is the only person in the world who has won five times a Gourmand World Cookbook Awards
- He served as the director of Pèl & Ploma, a gastronomic collection of "La Magrana" editions
