= Josep Lladonosa i Giró =

Catalan chef and food writer

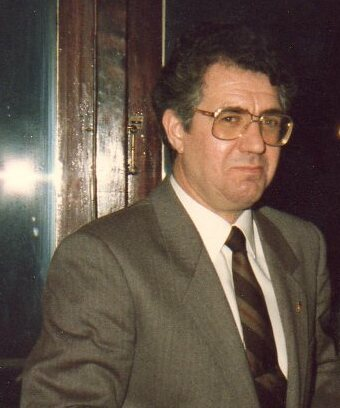
- Born: 1938; Alguaire, Province of Lleida (Catalonia, Spain)
- Culinary career
- Cooking style: Catalan tradition
- Award(s) won: Premio Nacional de Gastronomía; Creu de Sant jordi
- Website: http://llacrutech.com/grandpa/grandpa.html

Josep Lladonosa i Giró (Alguaire, Province of Lleida; 1938) is a Catalan chef and food writer from the province of Lleida. He has been a chef since the 1980s. Throughout his career, he has also conducted extensive research on cooking techniques, products, recipes and the culture tied to eating in Catalonia. He has documented these aspects of Catalan cuisine since the Middle Ages, as exemplified in his book Llibre de Sent Soví. Lladonosa has diffused this knowledge through a large number of books and articles, some of which have been translated into languages including Spanish, English and French. He is also a famous gastronomy teacher, collaborating with individuals such as Joan Amades and Jaume Fàbrega. In 2003, he was awarded the highest Catalan honour by the Generalitat de Catalunya, the Creu de Sant Jordi.

== Publications ==
- Invasions i intents d'integració de la Vall d'Aran a França ISBN 84-232-0616-5
- La cuina de Catalunya ISBN 84-474-0817-5
- La cuina medieval catalana ISBN 84-7222-148-2
- La cuina catalana d'ahir i d'avui ISBN 84-8256-128-6
- El llibre de les sopes ISBN 84-95907-22-4
- El gran llibre de la caça ISBN 84-9787-155-3
- The book of the Catalan Kitchen ISBN 84-206-0354-6
- La cuina que torna (1982) ISBN 84-7596-557-1
- La cocina medieval (1984) ISBN 84-7222-096-6
- Cocina de ayer, delicias de hoy (1989) ISBN 84-7222-418-X, ISBN 978-84-7222-418-6
- El gran libro de la cocina catalana (1991) ISBN 84-8307-347-1
- El llibre del guisats i les picades (1995) ISBN 84-7596-474-5
- El libro de los arroces (1996) ISBN 84-8307-050-2
- La cuina catalana més antiga (1998) ISBN 84-7596-628-4
- La cuina de dos grans mestres (2000) ISBN 84-7596-727-2
- Cocina catalana. Cocina regional (2000) ISBN 84-03-59421-6, ISBN 978-84-03-59421-0
- The Book of Paellas: All the rice dishes at the famous restaurante "Set Portes" of Barcelona and others, seasoned with the gastronomical wisdom of its master chef (2000) ISBN 84-607-0369-X
- Livre des paellas: tous les riz du célebre restaurant "Set Portes" de Barcelone concoctés par son chef cuisinier, theoricien de la gastronomie (2001) ISBN 84-932096-0-0
- L'escudella (2002) ISBN 84-95559-69-2
- The Great Sweet Fruit Book. Cultivation, History And Cooking (2002) ISBN 84-9743-039-5
- Plats amb història: Vivències i opinions (2003) ISBN 84-7596-240-8
- La cuina ecològica (2004) ISBN 978-84-9779-165-6
- La cuina tradicional catalana a l'abast (2005) ISBN 978-84-664-0666-6
- Cent plats amb fruita (2006) ISBN 978-84-9779-382-7
- La cuina de les terres de Lleida (2006) ISBN 978-84-664-0710-6
