= Spanish cuisine =

Culinary traditions of Spain

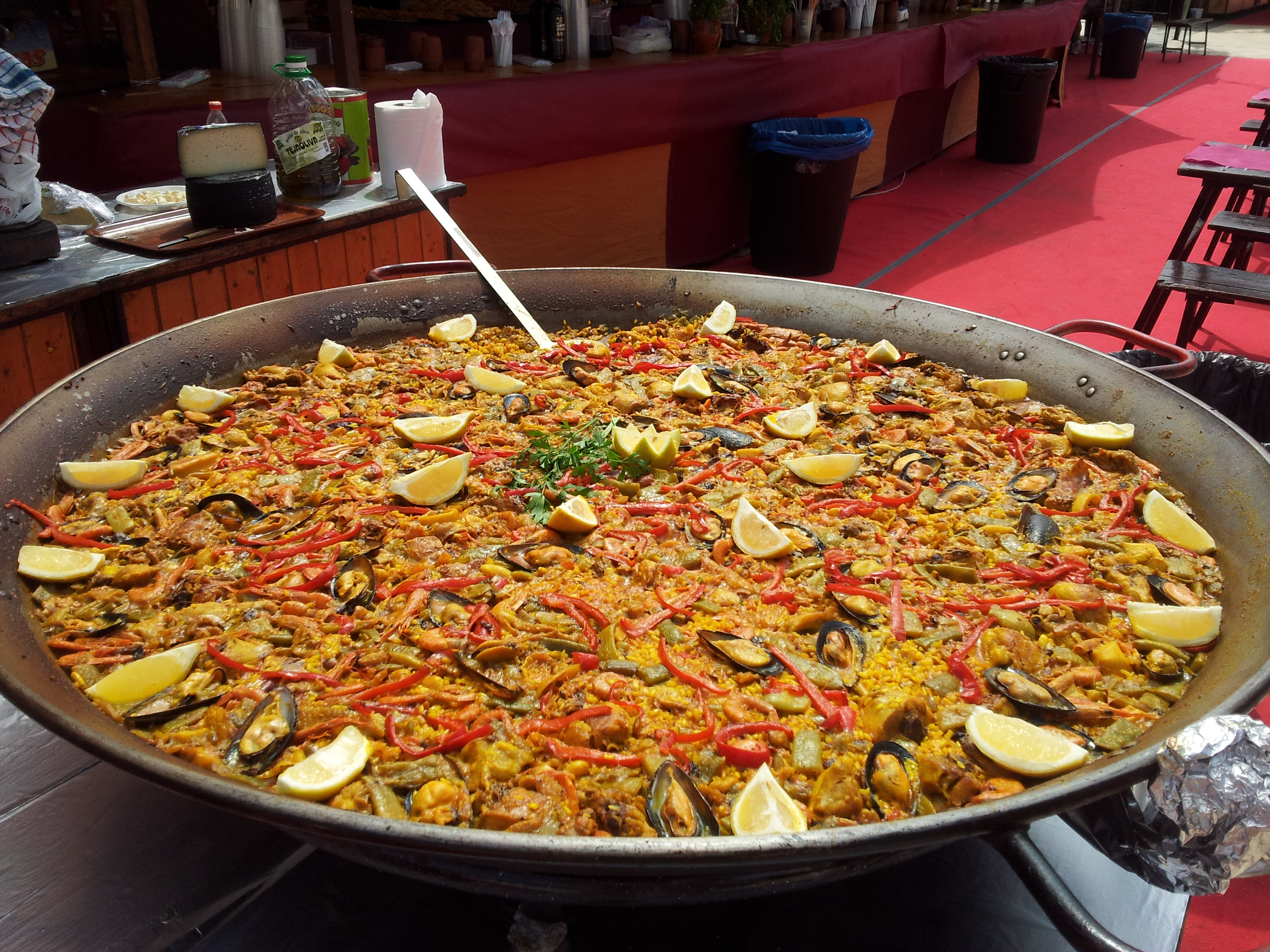
Paella mixta

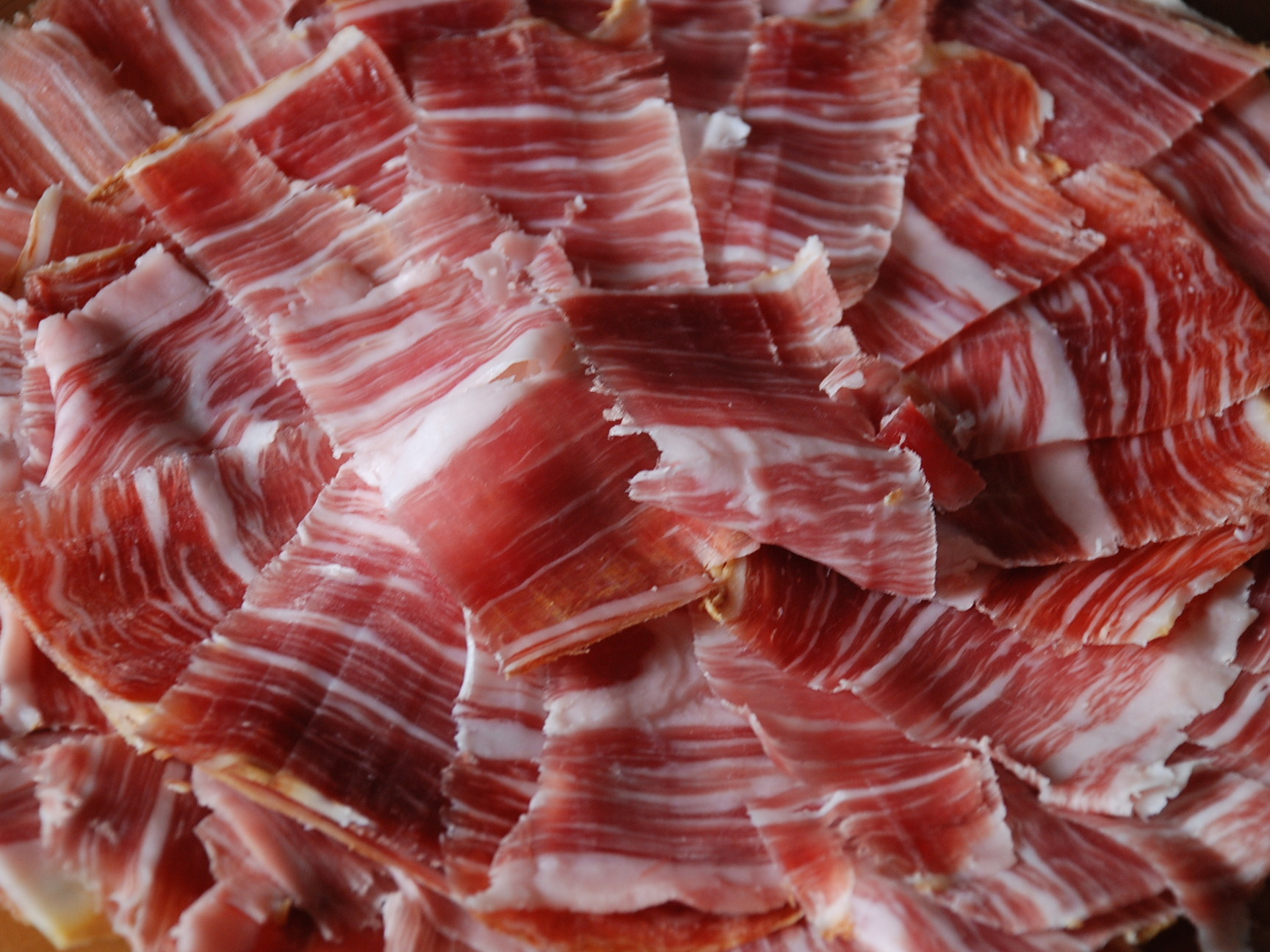
Slices of jamón ibérico

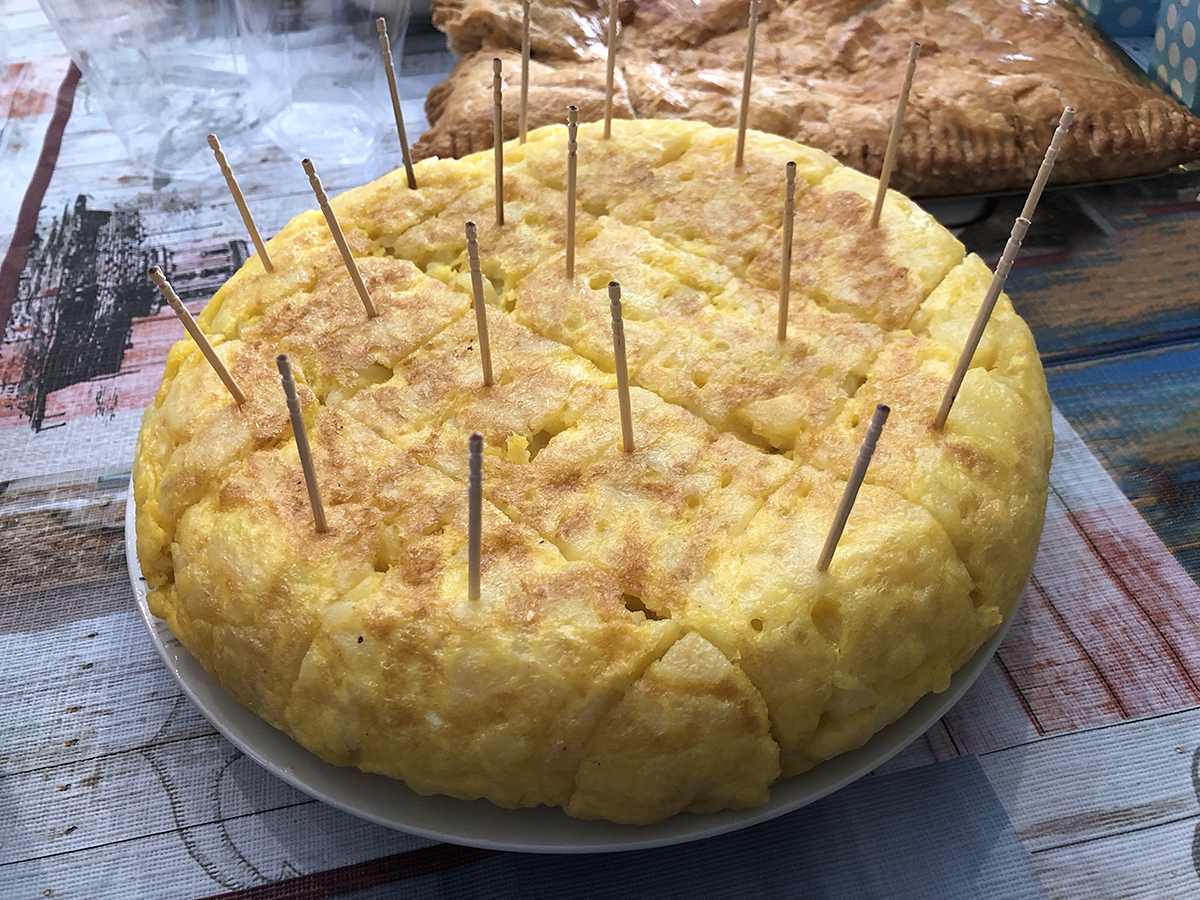
Tortilla de patatas

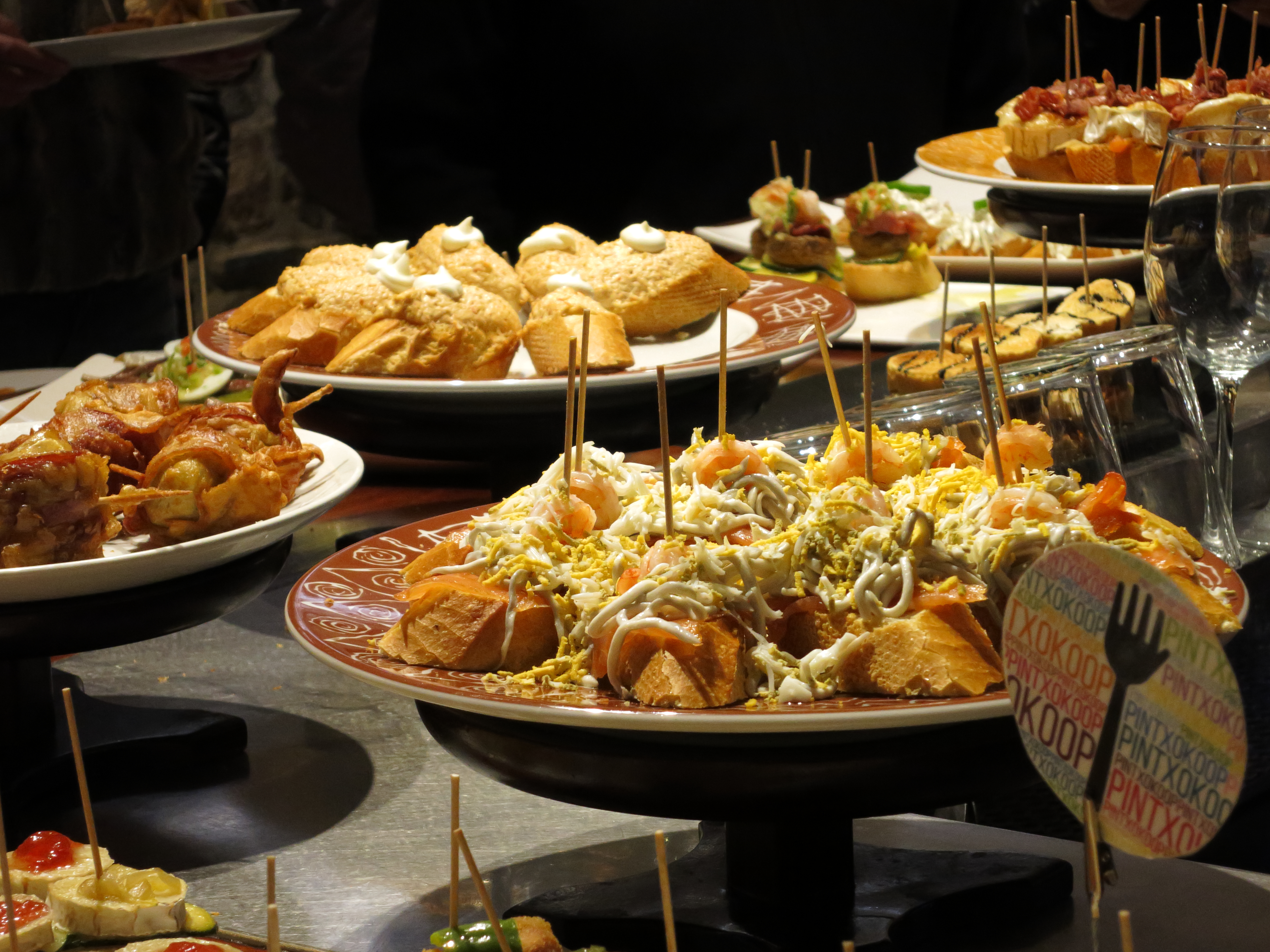
Pintxos

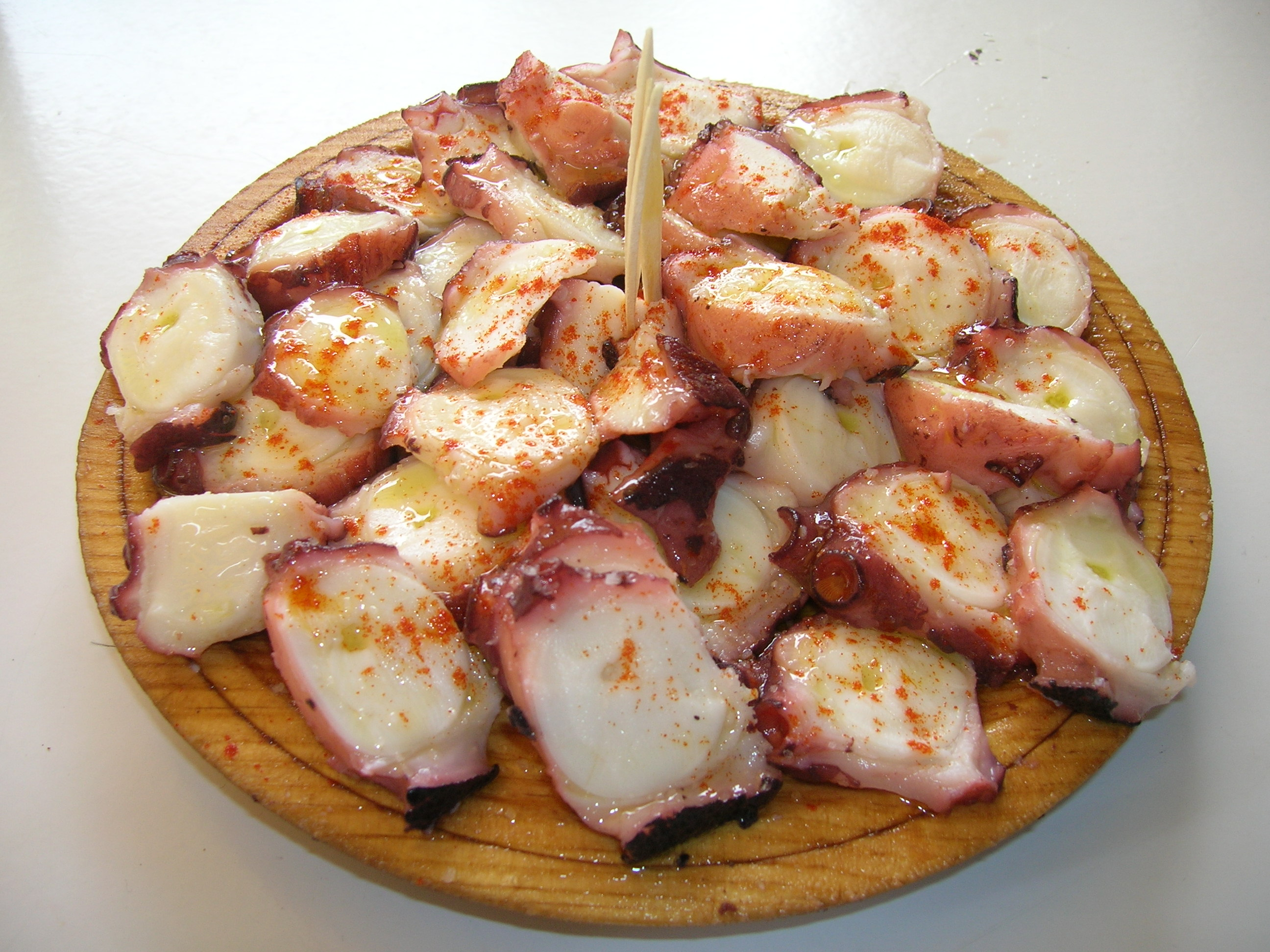
Polbo á feira

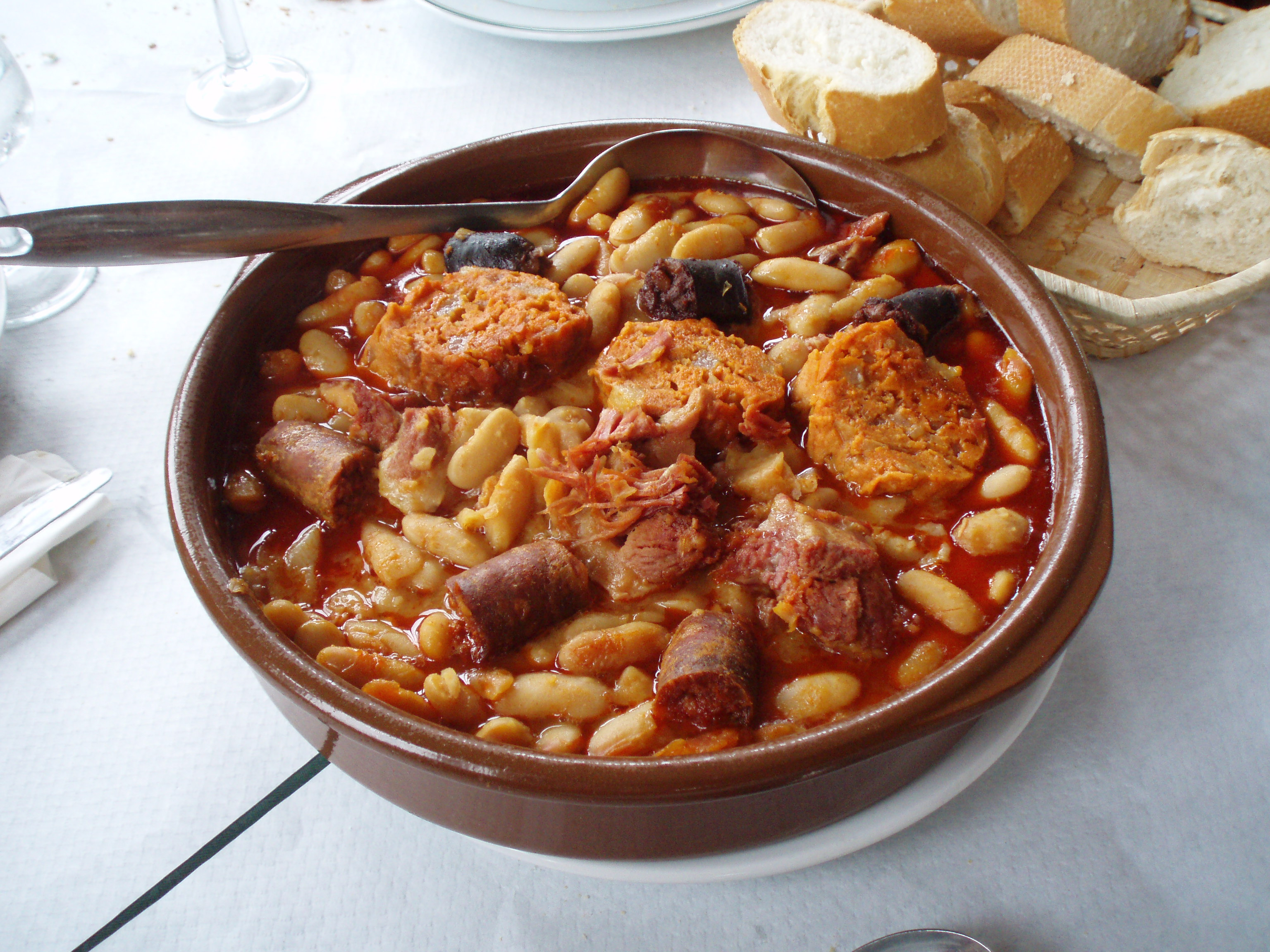
Fabada asturiana

Spanish cuisine (Spanish: cocina española) consists of the traditions and practices of Spanish cooking. It features considerable regional diversity, with significant differences in different parts of the country. The different culinary traditions in the Iberian Peninsula can be roughly categorized within the Mediterranean diet or the Atlantic diet.

Olive oil (of which Spain is the world's largest producer) is extensively used in Spanish cuisine. It forms the base of many vegetable sauces (known in Spanish as sofritos). Herbs most commonly used include parsley, oregano, rosemary and thyme. The use of garlic has been noted as common in Spanish cooking. The most-used meats in Spanish cuisine include chicken, pork, lamb and veal. Fish and seafood are also consumed on a regular basis. Tapas and pinchos are snacks and appetizers commonly served in bars and cafes.

== History ==
=== Antiquity ===
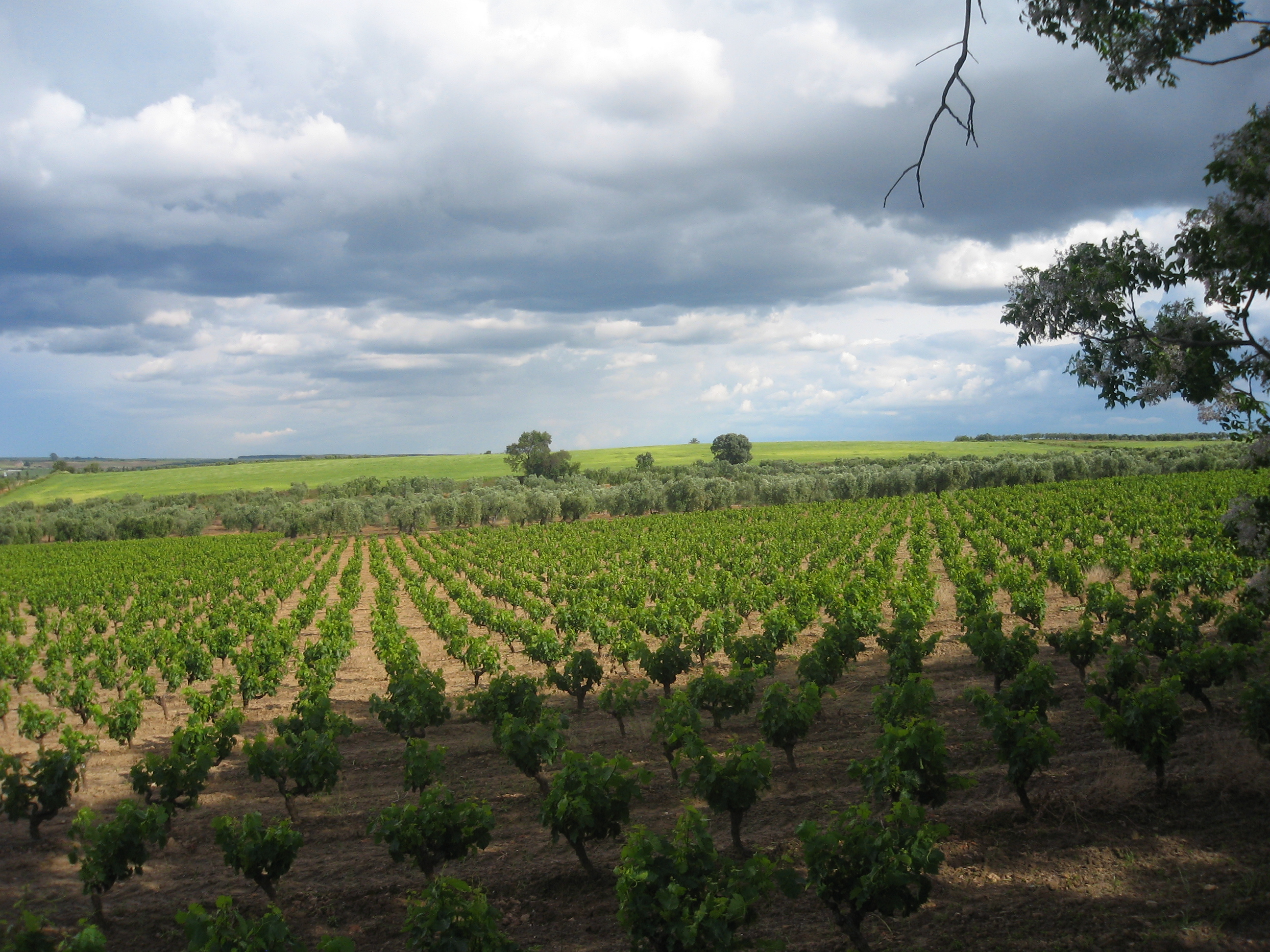
Cultivation of the Mediterranean triad, wheat, grapes, and olives, in the province of Huelva, representing the traditional staples of Mediterranean agriculture and cuisine.

Authors such as Strabo wrote about the aboriginal people of Spain using nuts and acorns as staple foods. The extension of vineyards along the Mediterranean seemed to be due to the colonization of Greeks and Phoenicians, who also introduced the production of olive oil. Spain became the largest producer of olive oil in the world. The growing of crops of the so-called tríada mediterránea (the "Mediterranean triad": wheat, grapes, and olives) underpinned the staple meal products for the inhabitants of the south of the Iberian Peninsula during the Roman Era (bread, wine and oil).

=== Middle Ages ===
The Visigoths' limited but lasting contributions to Spanish cuisine included the consumption of fermented milk products.

It is believed rice was introduced in the 6th century by the Byzantines. After the Muslim conquest of the Iberian peninsula in the 8th century, rice cultivation was expanded by the Arabs. New irrigation techniques were brought from the Indian subcontinent led to the cultivation of crops such as sugar cane, watermelon, lemon and oranges. Other ingredients believed to have been introduced in the Iberian Peninsula during the Hispano-Muslim period include sorghum, spinach, eggplant, peach, apricot and saffron. The most famous Spanish dish, paella, uses two ingredients that were probably popularized during the Al-Andalus period: rice and saffron.

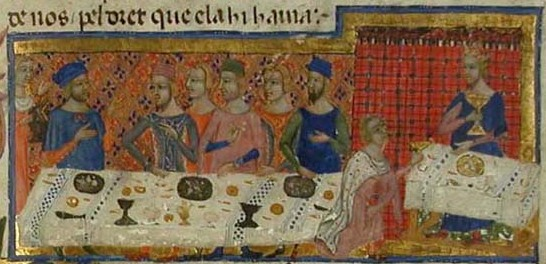
Illustration of the "Supper of Tarragona" of James I of Aragon in an edition of the Llibre dels fets, published in 1343.

The Moors also developed the basis for the art of pastry-making and introduced escabeche, a food preservation technique relying on vinegar. Dishes like ajo blanco, alboronía, alajú, hallulla, albóndigas, mojama, arrope, were some of the many legacies of Moorish cuisine. Although Muslim religion did not allow alcoholic drinks, the consumption of wine was widespread as the Qur'anic precepts never got to overrule the preexisting traditions. There are many accounts of the "drinking chats" of Abd al-Rahman II, Abd al-Rahman III and Almanzor.

Observing kashrut regulations, the Jews and Conversos drained meat of blood and did not eat pork products. Potajes were an important part of Jewish cuisine in the Middle Ages, most notably adafina (a local name for a Cholent dish) along with other Jewish culinary legacies in Spain. Almodrote was a Sephardic recipe in origin.

Early cookbooks in Spain include Llibre de Sent Soví (1324) and Ruperto de Nola's Llibre de Coch (1520), both written in the Catalan language. Among the earliest cooking books in pre-modern Iberia are the Fiḍālat al-Jiwān fī Ṭayyibāt al-Ṭaʿām wa-l-Alwān by Murcia-born Ibn Razīn al-Tujībī and the anonymous Kitāb al-Ṭabikh fī al-Maghrib wa al-Andalus fī ʽAṣr al-Muwaḥḥidīn, li-muʽallif majhūl, written in Arabic.

=== Modern era ===
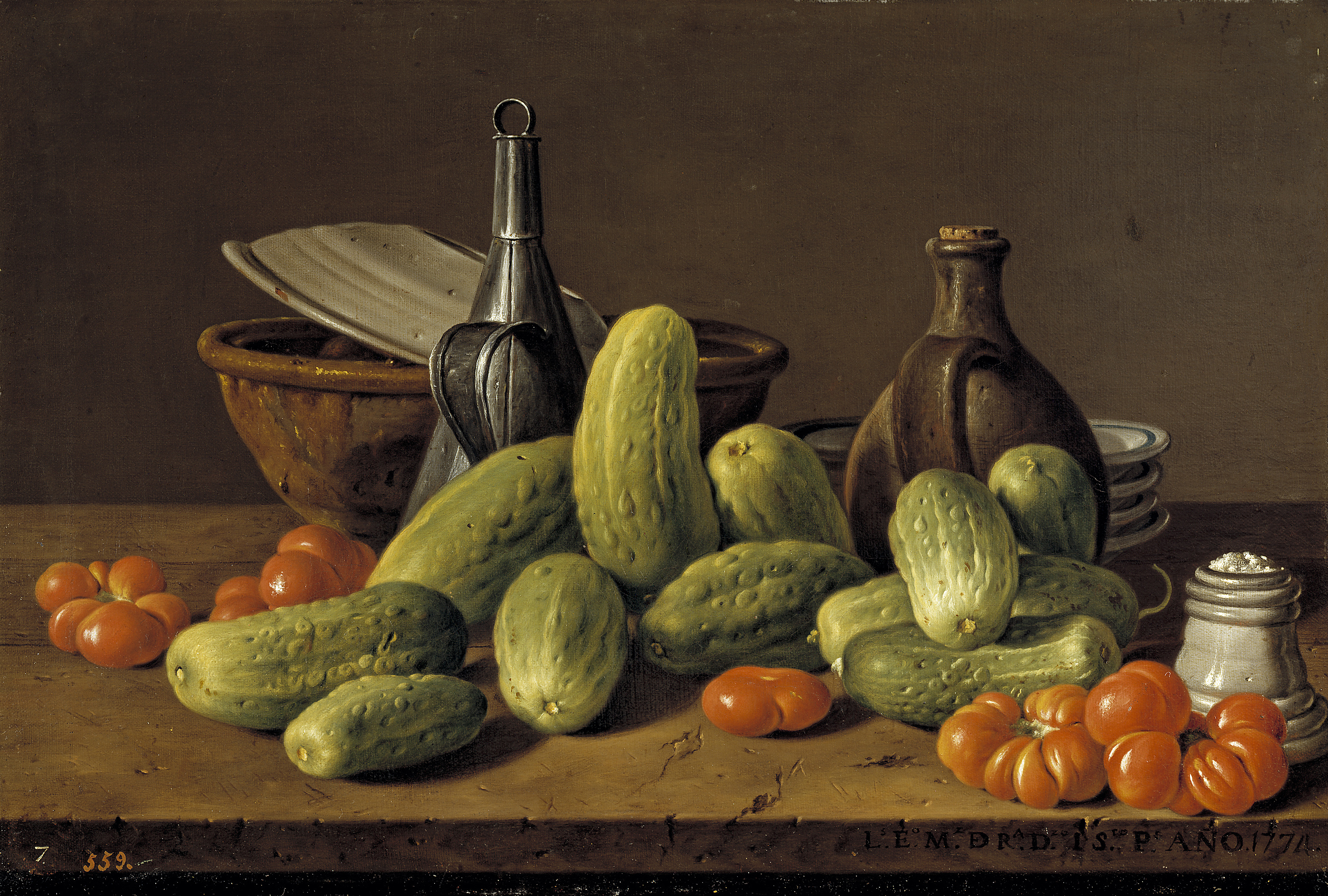
Still-life painting by Luis Egidio Meléndez (1774), showcasing fresh cucumbers and tomatoes.

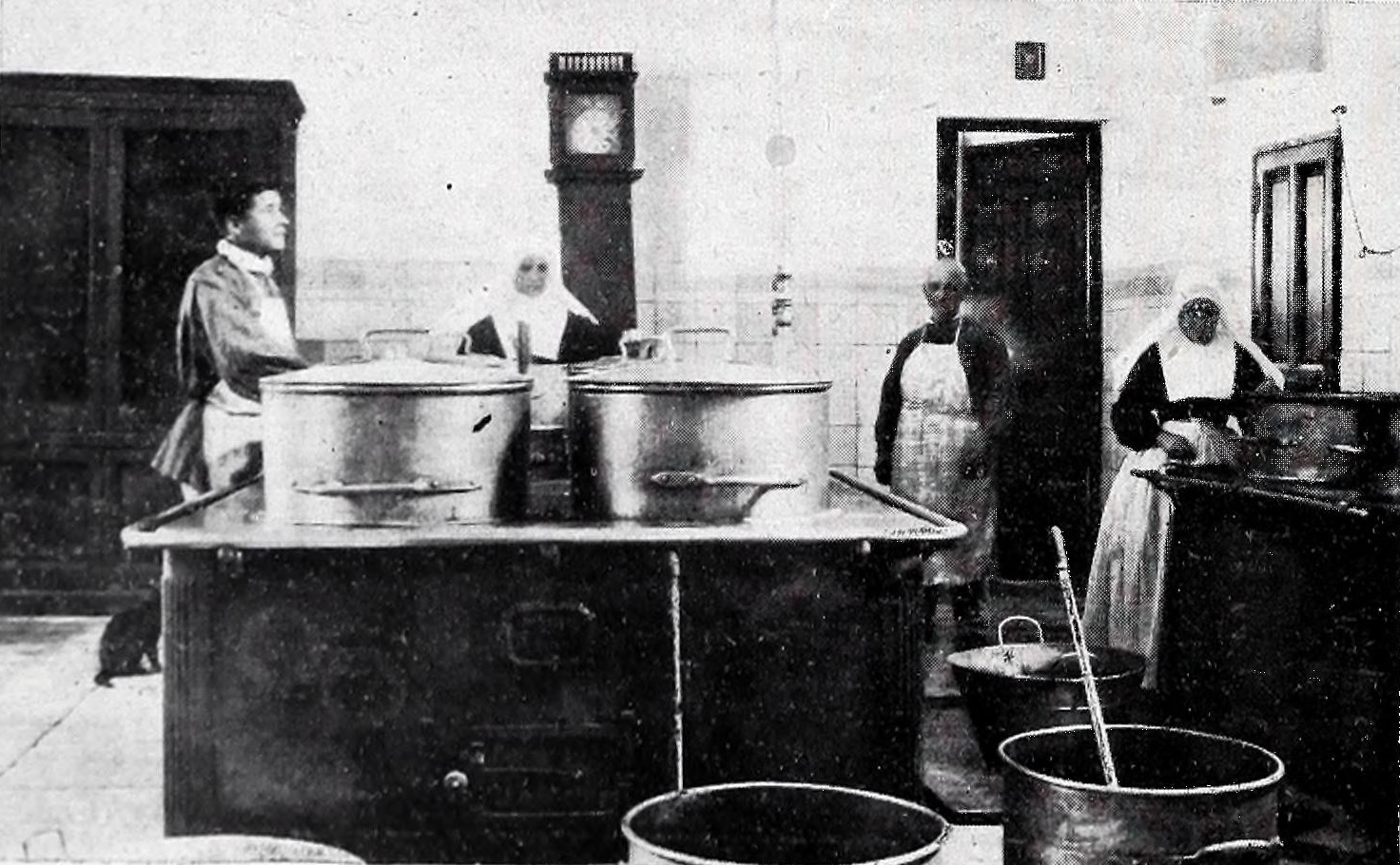
Kitchen at the Asylum of San Bernardino in Madrid (c. 1908).

The arrival of Europeans in the Americas in 1492 initiated the advent of new culinary elements, such as tomatoes, potatoes, maize, bell peppers, spicy peppers, paprika, vanilla and cocoa. Spain was where chocolate was first mixed with sugar to temper its natural bitterness. Other ingredients traveled to the Americas, such as rice, grapes, olives, and many types of cereals.

Influenced by Arabic harisa, grain-based soups such as farinetes (along the Mediterranean coast) and, similarly, gachas (in the Central Plateau) were customary in Early Modern Spain.

Foreign visitors noted with disdain the Spaniards' use of olive oil and lard for cooking rather than their preferred butter. The latter was barely available and, according to the 17th-century account of Madame d'Aulnoy, on the rare occasions that it was, would come "from afar, preserved in pig's tripes and full of worms". Butter was only produced locally in places such as Galicia, Asturias and Soria, or was imported, preserved in potassium nitrate, (the so-called "Flanders' butter").

By the 18th century, many American ingredients, such as peppers and tomatoes, had been fully incorporated into Spanish cuisine. Contemporary foreign visitors, such as French ambassador Jean-François de Bourgoing, judged negatively this change happening in Spain by the late part of the century: "Spanish cooking, which they have inherited, is not generally pleasing to foreigners. Spaniards like strong condiments such as pepper, tomato sauce, hot peppers and saffron, which color or infect nearly all their dishes."

Spain was the bridge for the Columbian exchange between the rest of Europe and the New World. Many traditional Spanish dishes such as tortilla de patata (an omelette made with potatoes), would not be possible without the Columbian exchange. Gazpacho, salmorejo, and pan con tomate are made with tomatoes, which traveled from the New World to the Old World.

For most of the 19th century, the aristocracy consumed a set of dishes that was largely an imitation of French cuisine. That was the available cuisine at the time, together with the degeneration of regional cuisines. One positive foreign take on the Spanish dishes—opposing the largely negative views of other foreign commentators—was that of Richard Ford, who was fond of Spanish specialties such as sherry and ham.

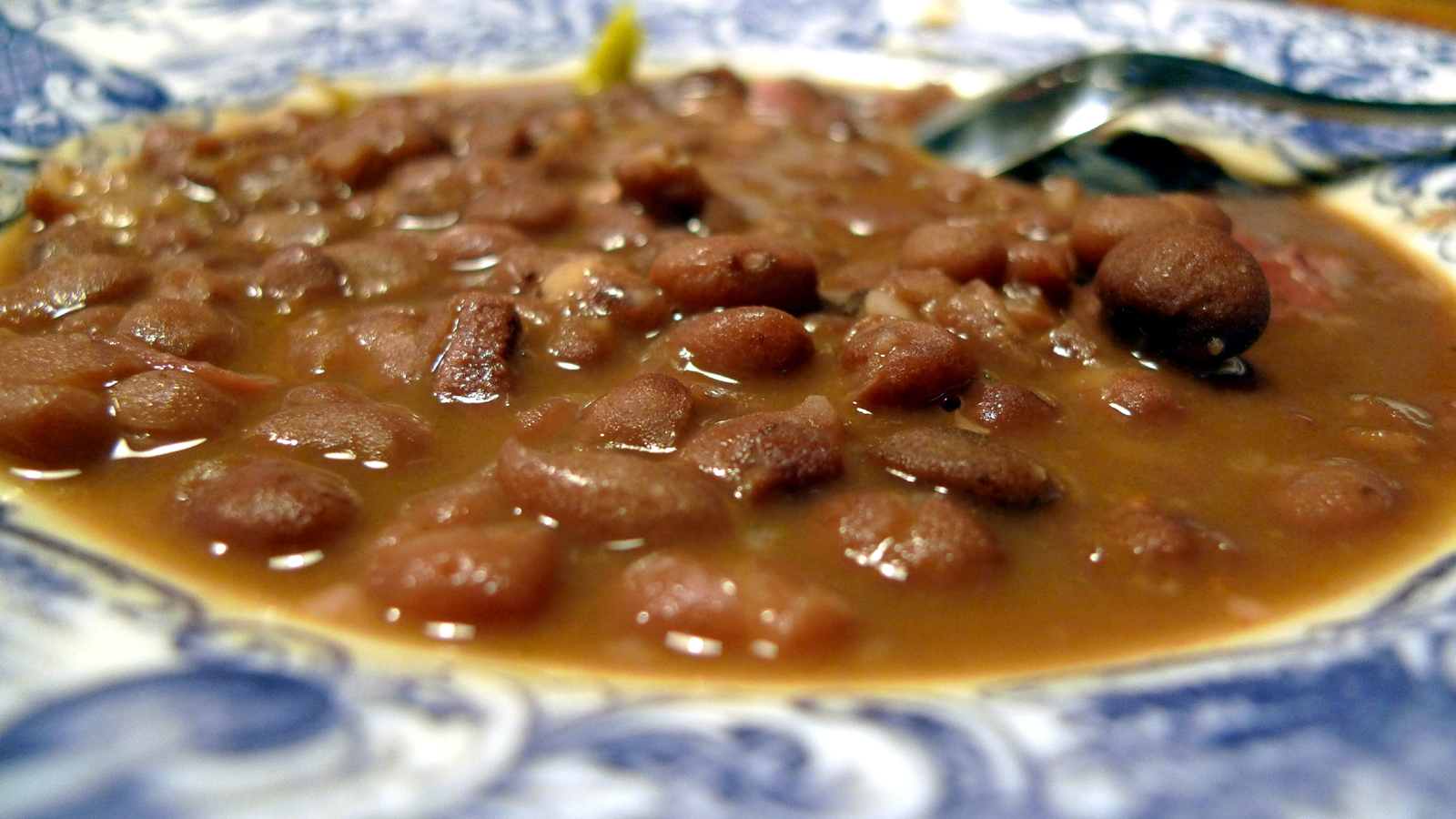
Traditional olla podrida from Covarrubias, Spain. A historic stew that blends Old World meats and legumes with New World ingredients like peppers, representing the culinary legacy of the Columbian Exchange and Spain’s evolving national cuisine.

Modern Spanish cuisine was gestated in the late-19th to early-20th century, with gastronomes and writers such as Mariano Pardo de Figueroa (Dr. Thebussem), José Castro y Serrano, Ángel Muro, Emilia Pardo Bazán, and Dionisio Pérez, some of whom put effort into developing the idea of a "national cuisine" recognisable by Spaniards as their own.

Keen on participating in the Spanish nation-building process, Dr. Thebussem, in an autochthonous example of culinary nationalism, proposed to the King's Chef that the olla podrida (a rustic stew typically made of meat, legumes and other vegetables) should be served at official banquets as a national dish. This could be considered an important step in the process of straying away from the French cooking paradigm, which was dominant in the 19th century in Europe. Olla podrida had been previously ridiculed in foreign (most notably French) satires.

Although the new foodscape built in opposition to the French centralist culinary model accounted for the awareness of the distinctive regional singularities, subsequent food writers in the country would continue to cope with the tension between the Spanish peripheral and centralist foodscapes.

The influential cooking book 1080 recetas de cocina by Simone Ortega (first published in 1972) became a hit in Spain, remaining as of 2019 the third best-selling book ever in the history of the country after Don Quixote and the Bible. This was not a book exclusively of Spanish traditional recipes, but also included French recipes, bringing an exotic penchant to Spanish homes.

Televised cooking shows started in the country in 1984 with Con las manos en la masa.

== Meal routines ==
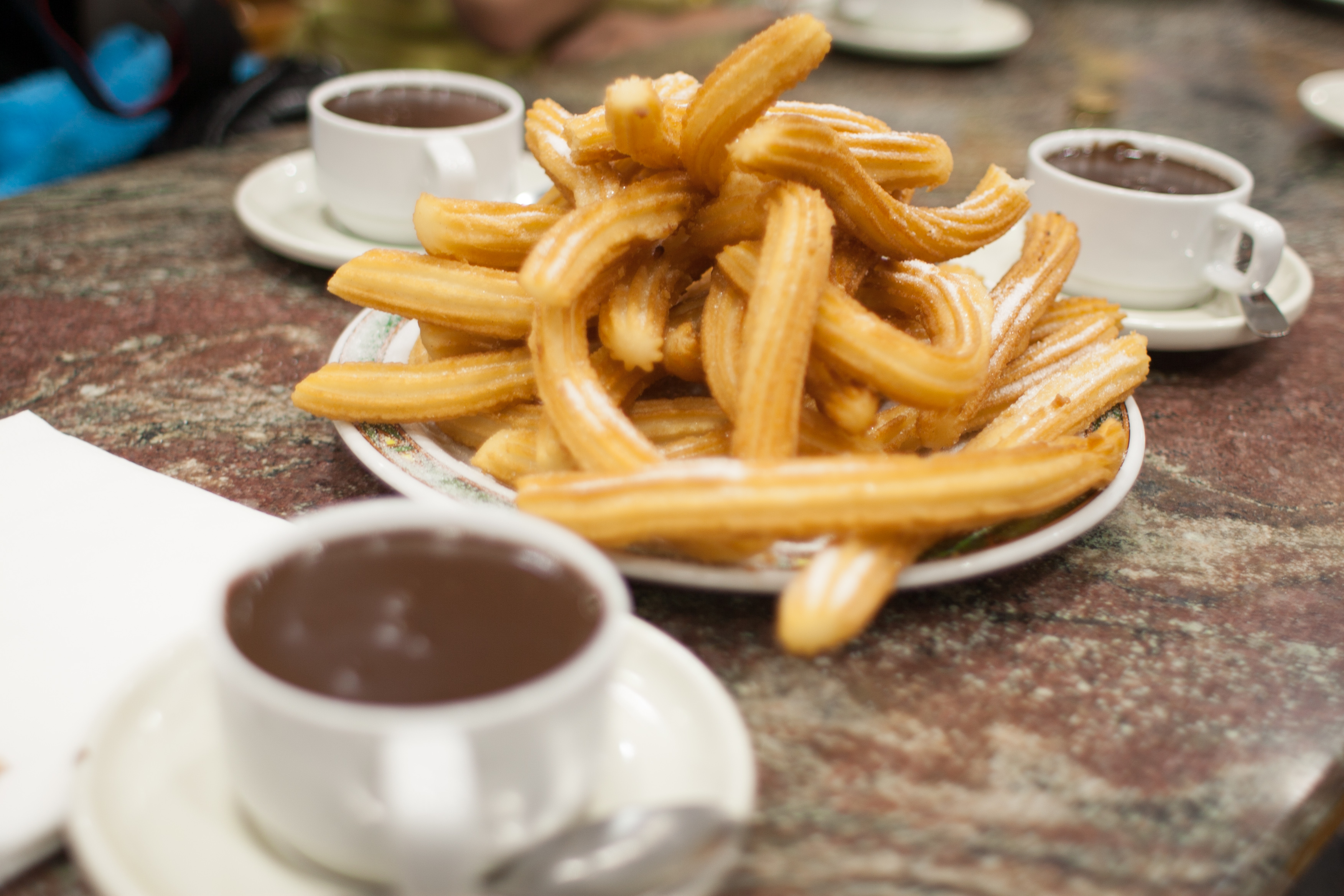
Chocolate con churros, a popular Spanish breakfast consisting of fried dough pastries served with thick hot chocolate for dipping.

A continental-style breakfast (desayuno) may be eaten just after waking up, or before entering the workplace. Common breakfast items include coffee, milk, chocolate drink, biscuits (most notably Marie biscuits), magdalenas, toast (featuring ingredients such as oil, tomato and butter), and churros.

Due to the large time span between breakfast and lunch, it is not uncommon to halt the working schedule to take a mid-morning snack.

Lunch (el almuerzo or la comida, literally meaning "the meal"), the large midday meal in Spain, contains several courses, especially in restaurants. In some regions of Spain, the word almuerzo refers to the mid-morning snack, instead of lunch. Lunch usually starts around 2:00–2:30 p.m. and finishes around 3:00–3:30 p.m., and is usually followed by sobremesa, which refers to the table talk that Spanish people undertake. Menus are organized according to these courses and include five or six choices in each course. At home, Spanish meals contain one or two courses and a dessert. The content of this meal is usually a soup dish, salad, a meat or a fish dish, and a dessert such as fruit, yoghurt or something sweet. Tapas may also be typically served before or during lunch.

According to a 2017 report, the Spanish government has taken steps to shorten the traditional long lunch break in an effort to end the workday earlier. Most businesses shut down for two or three hours for lunch, then resume the working day until dinner time in the evening.

La cena, meaning both dinner or supper, is taken between 8:30 p.m. and 11:00 p.m. It typically consists of one course and dessert. Due to the large time span between lunch and dinner, an afternoon snack, la merienda, equivalent to afternoon tea, may take place at about 6:00 p.m. At merienda, people typically drink coffee, eat something sweet, or eat a sandwich or a piece of fruit.

Some country-wide staple dishes common throughout Spain include croquetas (croquettes), paella (a rice dish from the Valencian community), ensaladilla rusa (Olivier salad), gazpacho (a cold vegetable soup), and tortilla de patatas (Spanish omelette). There is a disagreement in Spanish society regarding onion as an ingredient in the Spanish omelette, often accompanied by highly opinionated views on either side.

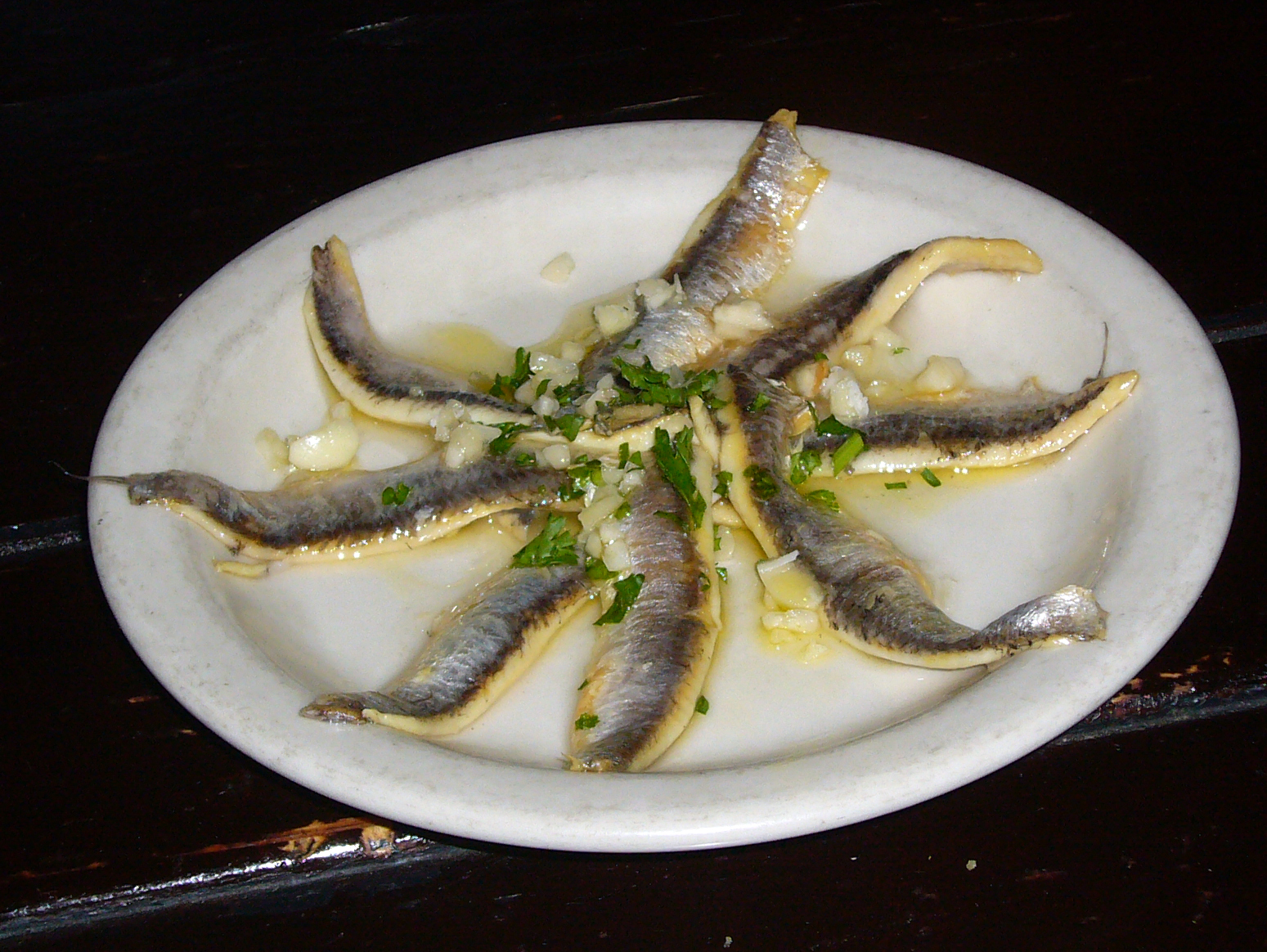
Boquerones en vinagre, marinated white anchovies, a classic tapa.

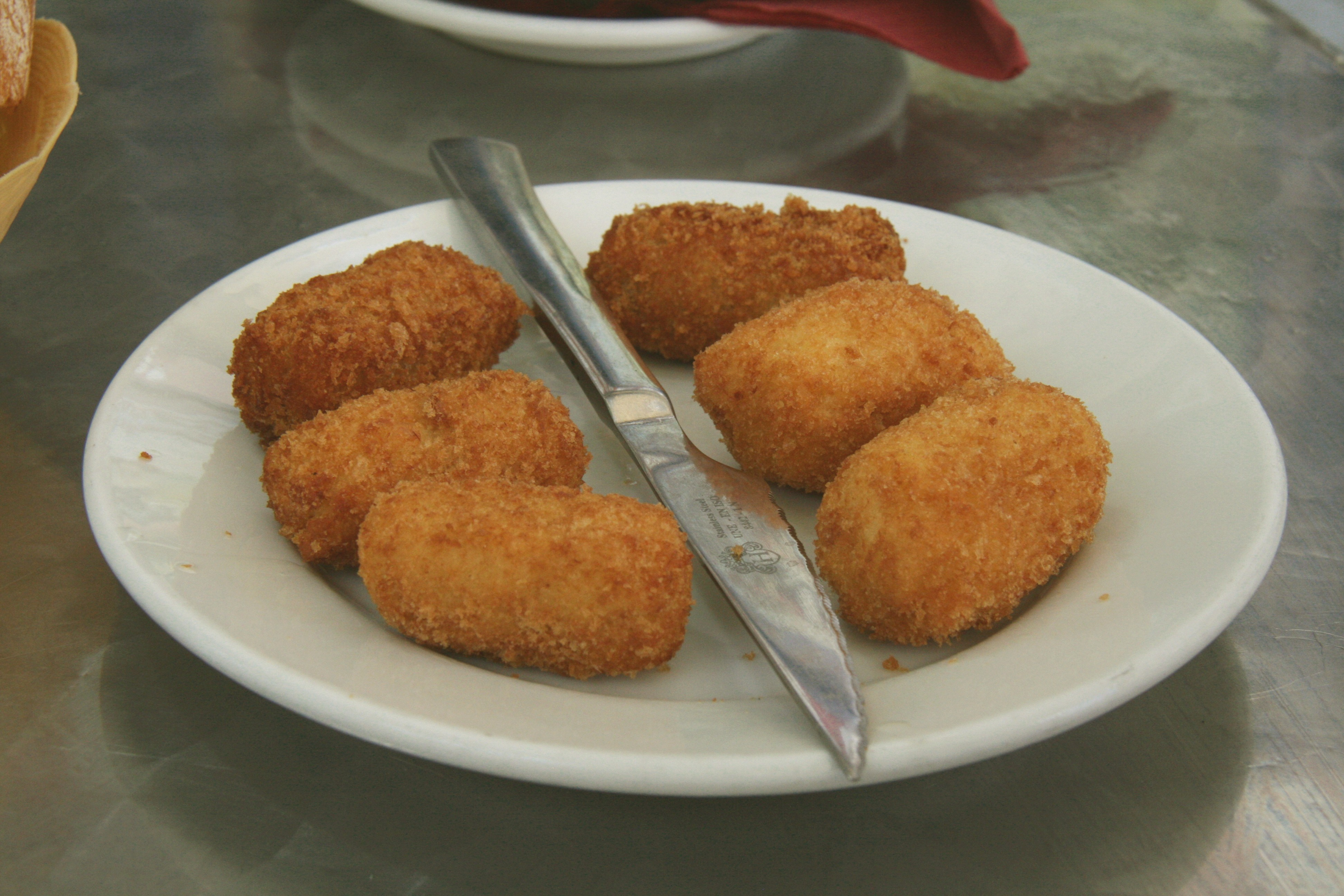
Croquetas, breaded and fried rolls typically filled with ham, chicken, or cod.

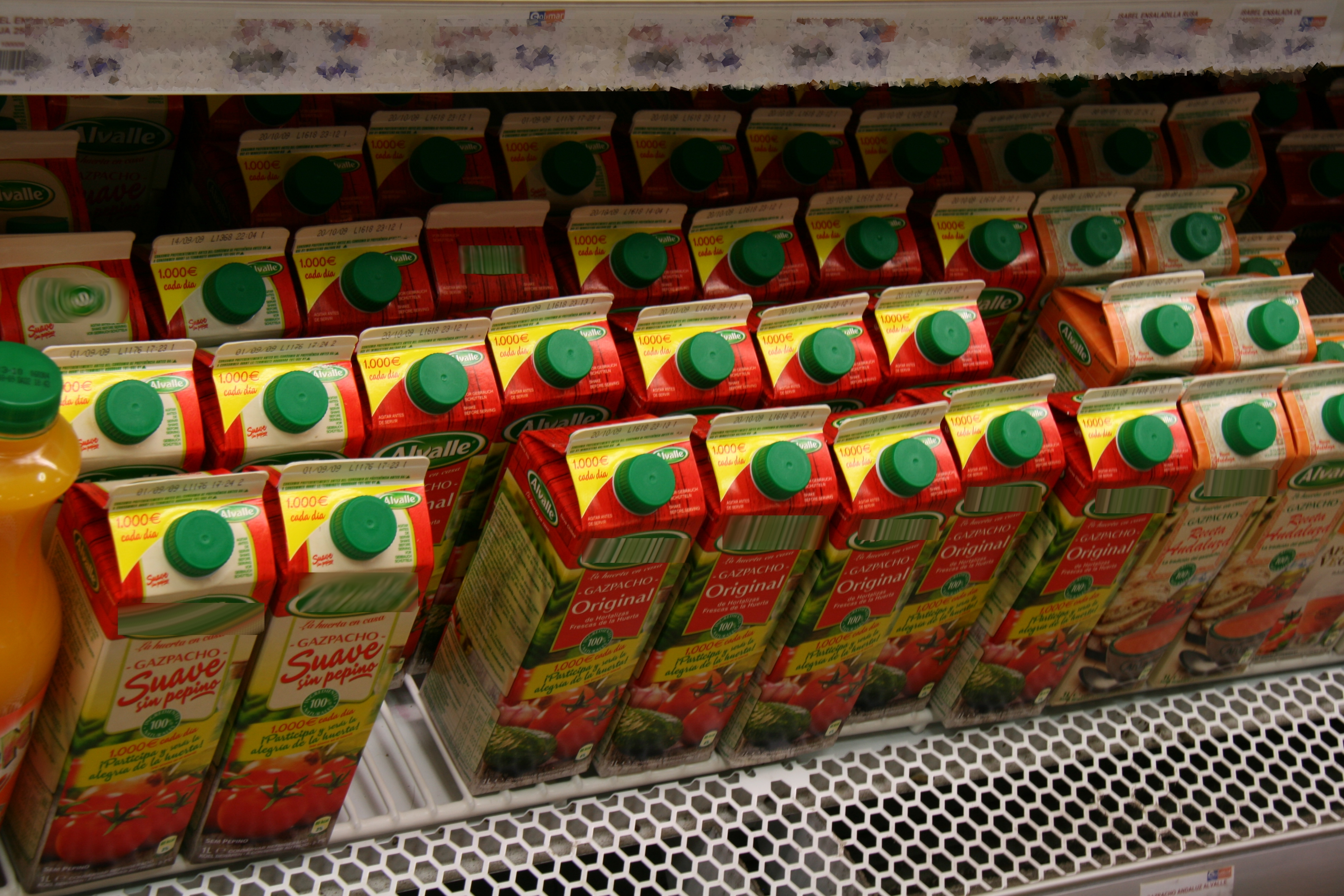
Processed gazpacho in ready-to-drink carton packages, widely available in supermarkets.

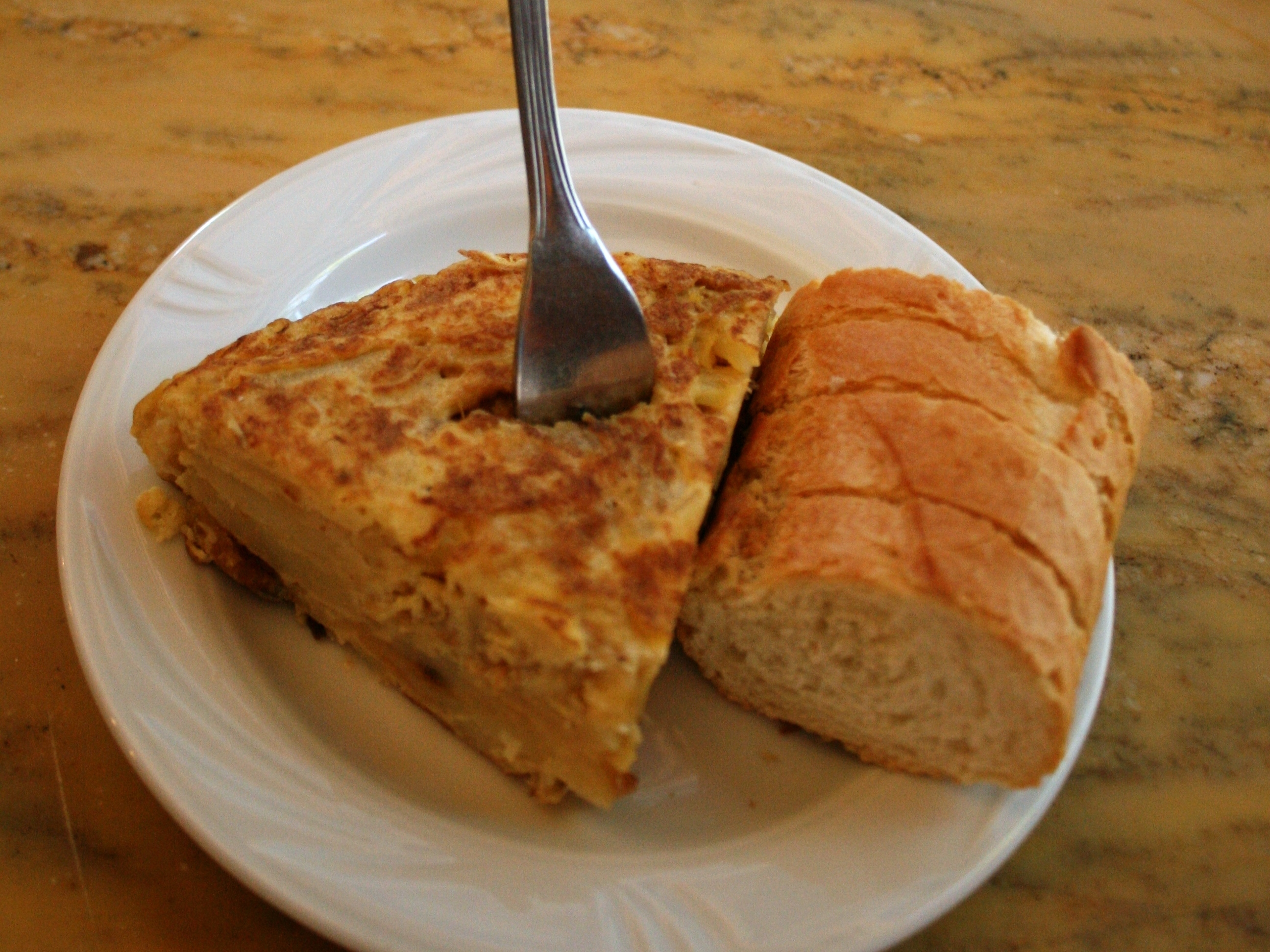
Pincho de tortilla – a slice of Spanish omelette often served on bread.

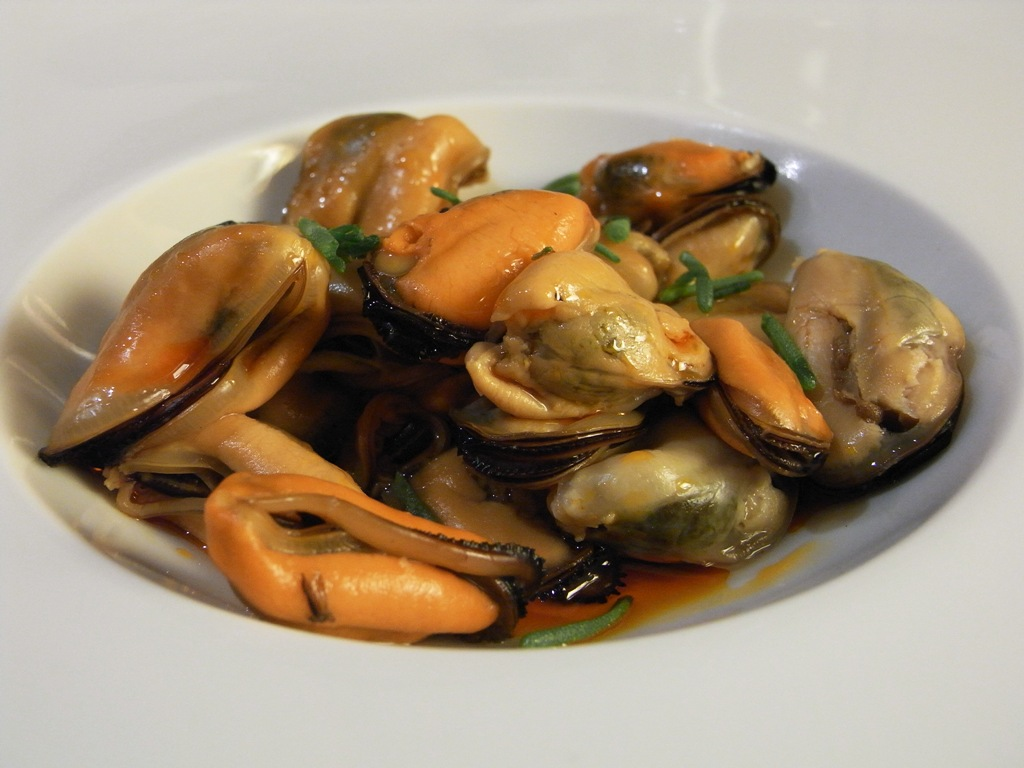
Mejillones en escabeche – pickled mussels preserved in vinegar, oil, and spices.

Tapas (appetizers), served before lunch or dinner, or during them, are common. It is also common for tapas to be provided as a complimentary appetizer in bars and cafes when ordering a drink. Other common tapas include mejillones en escabeche (marinated mussels), gildas, albóndigas (meatballs), callos, torreznos, or raxo de cerdo.

== Regional cuisines ==
=== Andalusia ===
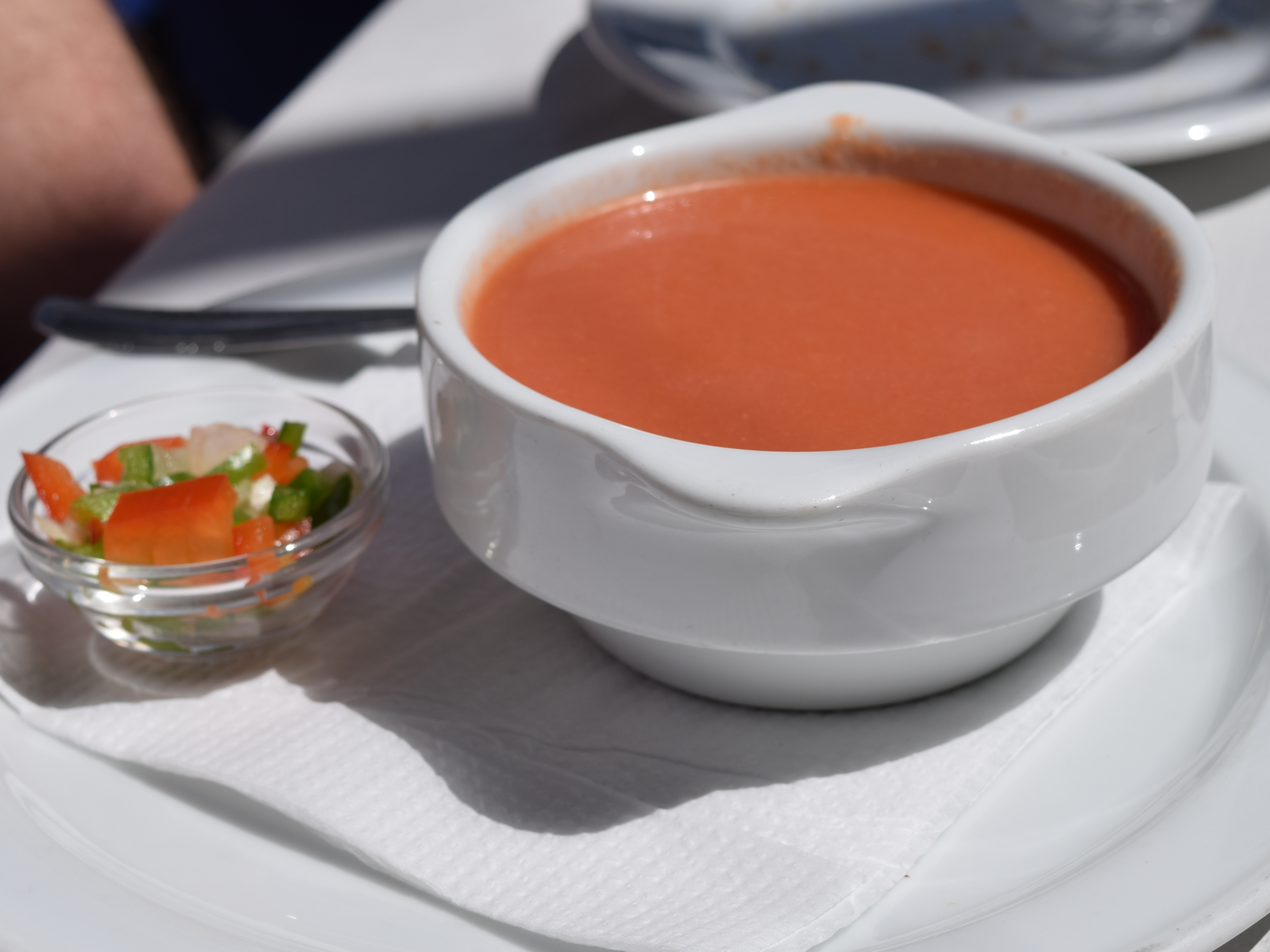
Gazpacho malagueño, a cold soup from southern Spain, typically made with tomatoes, bread, olive oil, garlic, vinegar, and served with finely chopped vegetables (picaíto) as garnish.

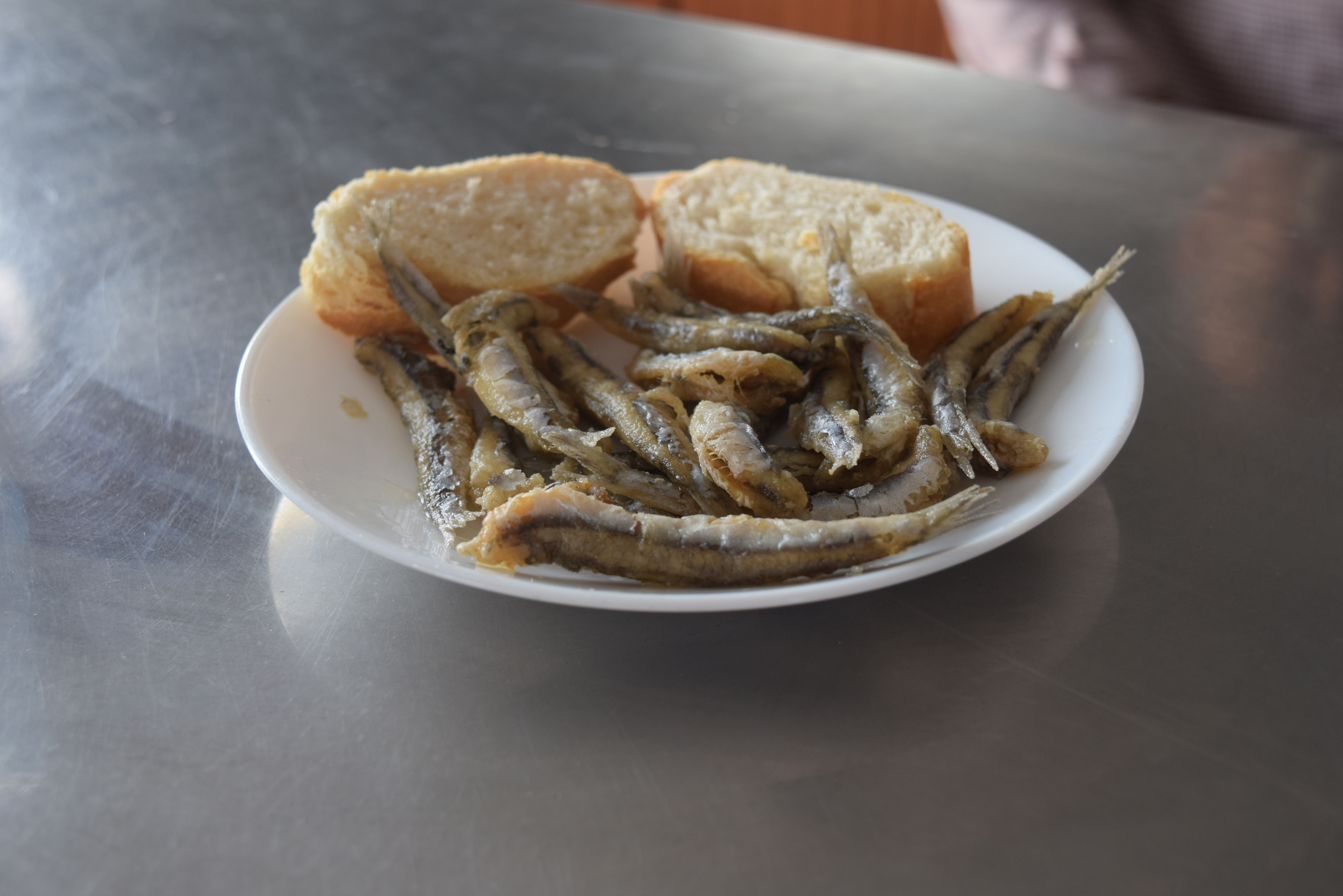
Boquerones fritos, a popular Andalusian tapa of deep-fried anchovies, typically coated in flour and served hot with lemon.

Andalusian cuisine is twofold: rural and coastal. Of all the Spanish regions, this region uses the most olive oil in its cuisine. The Andalusian dish that has possibly achieved the most international fame is gazpacho, a cold soup made with chopped vegetables, such as tomatoes and green peppers, vinegar, water, salt, olive oil, and bread (crumbs). Other cold soups include poleá, zoque and salmorejo.

Eating olives as a snack is common. Meat dishes include flamenquín, pringá, oxtail stew, and menudo gitano (also called Andalusian tripe). Hot soups include sopa de gato (made with bread), caldillo de perro (fish soup with orange juice) and migas canas. Fish dishes include pescaíto frito, soldaditos de Pavía, and parpandúa.

Cured meats include serrano ham and ibérico ham. Typical drinks in the area include anise, wine (such as Malaga, Jerez, and Pedro Ximénez), and sherry brandy.

=== Aragon ===
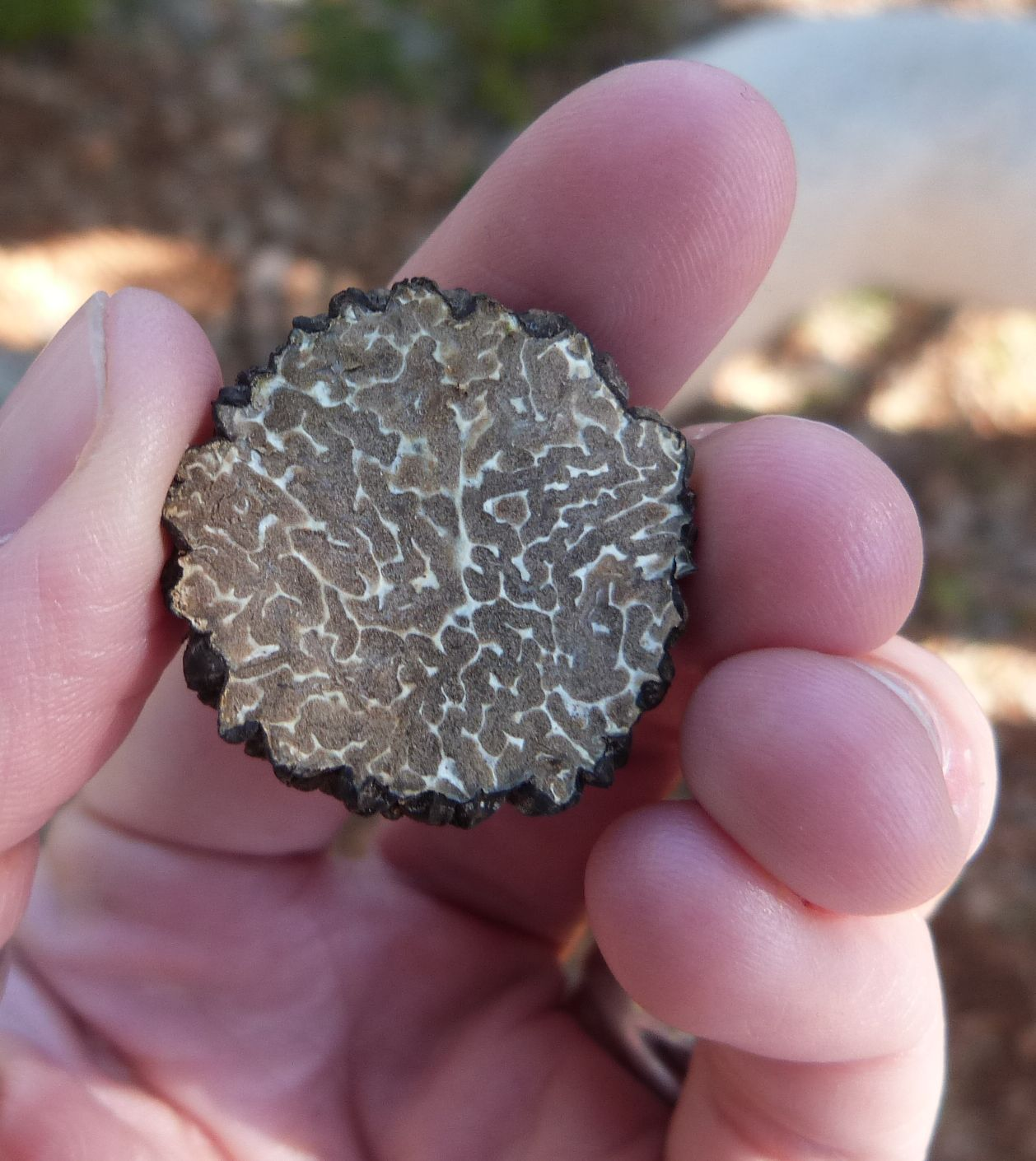
A sliced black truffle (Tuber melanosporum), a highly prized edible fungus known for its intense aroma and use in gourmet cuisine.

Aragonese cuisine has a rural origin. One of its most famous dishes is asado de ternasco (roast lamb), in which lamb is cooked with garlic, salt, olive oil, laurel leaves, thyme, and parsley. Pork dishes are also very popular, among them, magras con tomate. Popular Aragonese recipes made with bread are migas de Pastor, migas con chocolate, regañaos, and goguera.

Legumes are very important to Aragonese dishes, but the most popular vegetables are borage and thistle, as well as the famed tomate rosa de Barbastro. Jamón de Teruel and ham from Huesca are frequently used cured meats. Among the cheeses, queso de Tronchón is notable. Fruit-based cuisine includes frutas de Aragón (English: 'fruits of Aragon', candied fruits covered in chocolate) and maraschino cherries. Melocotón con vino consists of melocotón de Calanda, a regional peach variant, infused in red wine with sugar and cinnamon.

Other sweet Aragonese specialities are trenza de Almudevar, tortas de alma, guirlache (a type of nougat), adoquín del Pilar, and Españoletas (a kind of local cookie).

The prevalence of peaches in Aragonese cuisine extends to drinks. Sopeta is a traditional beverage emerging from sliced peach, white wine and sugar. The best-known wines of Aragon are those from Cariñena, Somontano (Huesca), Calatayud, and Campo de Borja.

=== Asturias ===
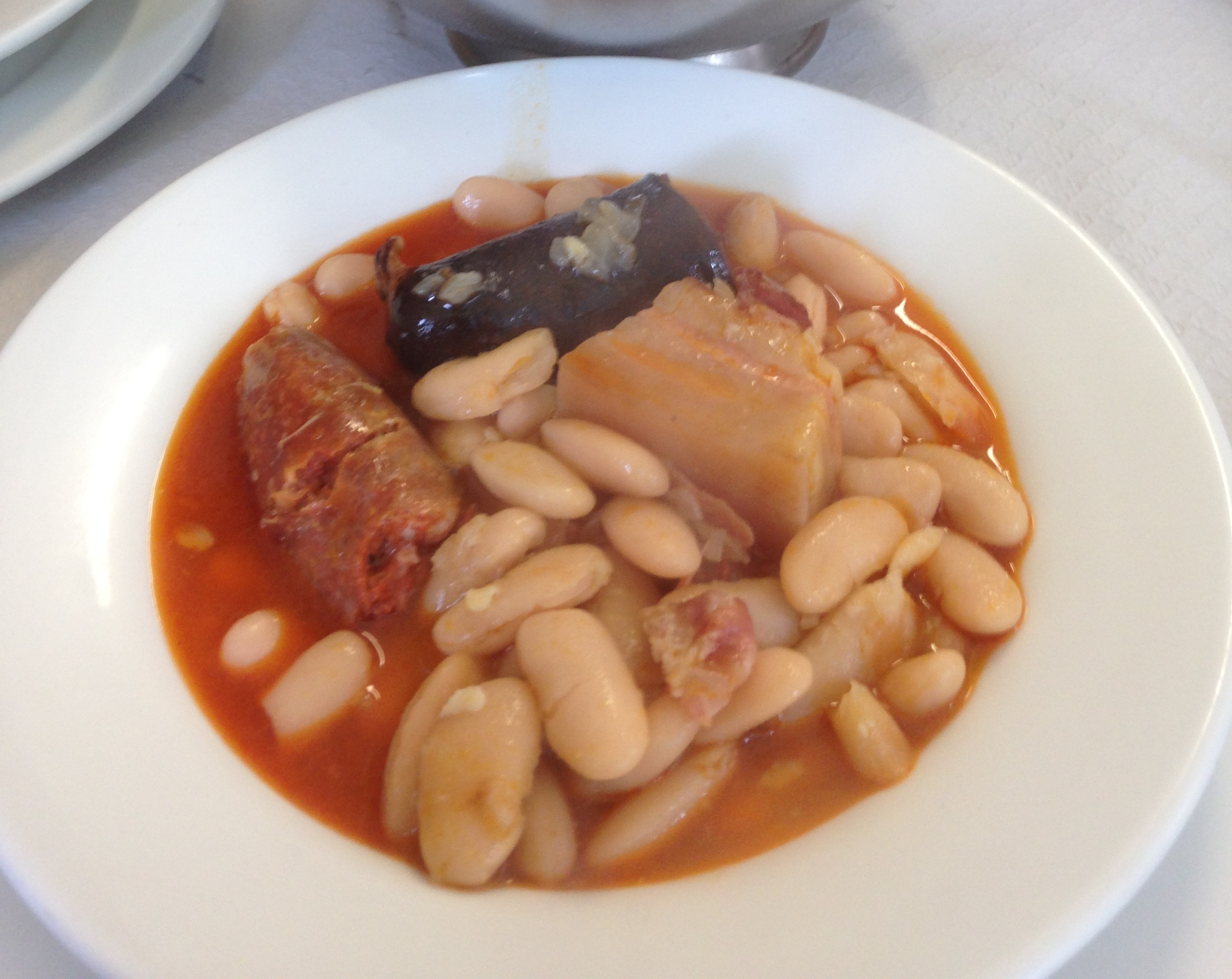
Fabada asturiana, a rich stew from Asturias, made with large white beans (fabes), chorizo, morcilla (blood sausage), and pork shoulder.

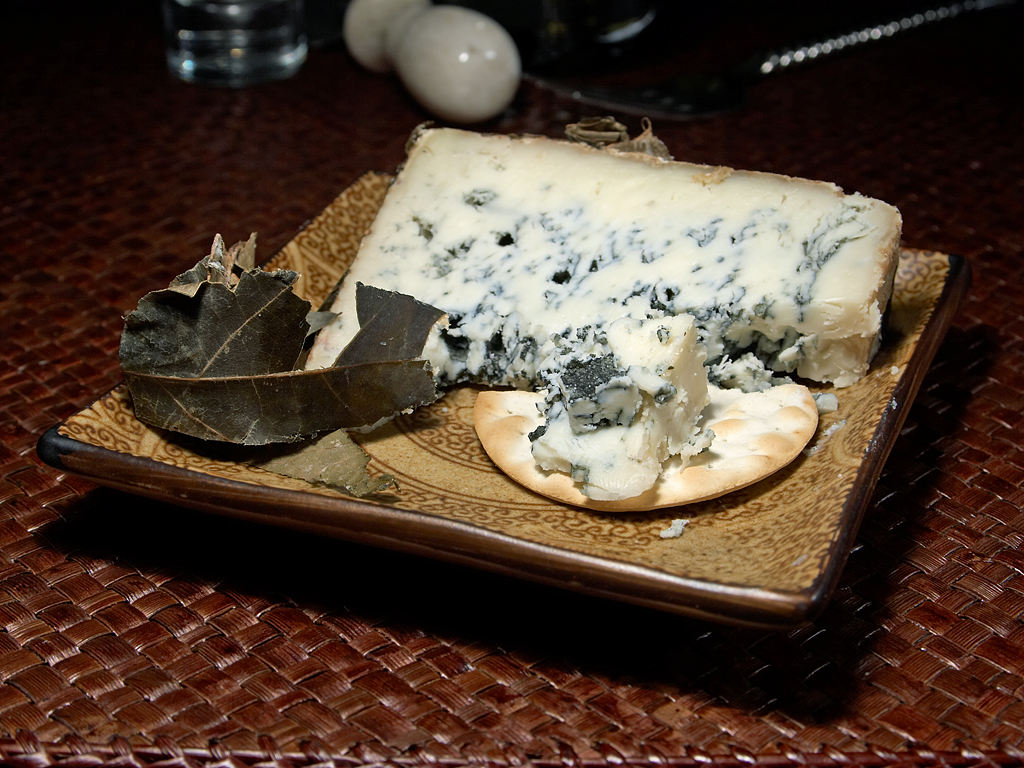
Cabrales cheese, a traditional blue cheese from Asturias, Spain, known for its strong, pungent flavor and made from a blend of cow milk, goat milk, and sheep milk.

Asturian cuisine has a long and rich history, deeply rooted in Celtic traditions of Atlantic Europe. One of its most famous dishes is fabada asturiana. Fabada is the traditional stew of the region, made with white beans, sausages (such as chorizo and morcilla), and pork. A well-known recipe is fabes con almejas (beans with clams). Asturian beans (fabes) can also be cooked with hare, partridge, prawns, or octopus. Another known recipe is pote asturiano (made with white beans, kale, potatoes, and a variety of sausages and bacon) and potaje de vigilia.

Pork-based foods such as chosco, callos a l'asturiana, and bollu preñáu (chorizo-stuffed bread rolls) are popular. Common meat dishes include carne gobernada (roasted veal), cachopo (a crunchy, crumb-coated veal steak stuffed with ham and cheese), and caldereta. Fish and seafood play an important role in Asturian cuisine. The Cantabrian Sea provides a rich variety of species, including tuna, hake and sardines. Asturian cheeses are very popular in the rest of Spain. Among them, the most representative is Cabrales cheese, a pungent, blue cheese developed in the regions near the Picos de Europa. Other popular cheese types are gamonéu afuega'l pitu, and queso de Pría. These are usually eaten with the local cider, a low-alcohol drink made of Asturian apples with a distinctive sourness.

Asturian cider, Sidra de Asturias, made of a special type of apple, is traditionally poured escanciada from a certain height, usually over the head of the waiter/server. When the cider falls into the glass from above, the drink "breaks", becoming aerated and bubbly. It is consumed immediately after being served, in consecutive, tiny shots.

Notable desserts are frisuelos (similar to crêpes, usually filled with cream or apple jam), rice pudding (white rice cooked with milk, lemon zest and sugar), and carbayón (dulce) (puff pastry cakes filled with almond mash and covered with sugar glaze).

=== Balearic Islands ===
Balearic cuisine has purely Mediterranean characteristics due to its location. The islands have been conquered several times throughout their history by the French and the English, which left some culinary influences. Some well-known food items are the sobrassada, arroz brut, mahón cheese, gin de Menorca (pelota), and mayonnaise. Among the dishes are tumbet, frito mallorquín, and roasted suckling pig. Popular desserts include ensaïmada, tambor d'ametlla, and suspiros de Manacor.

=== Basque Country ===
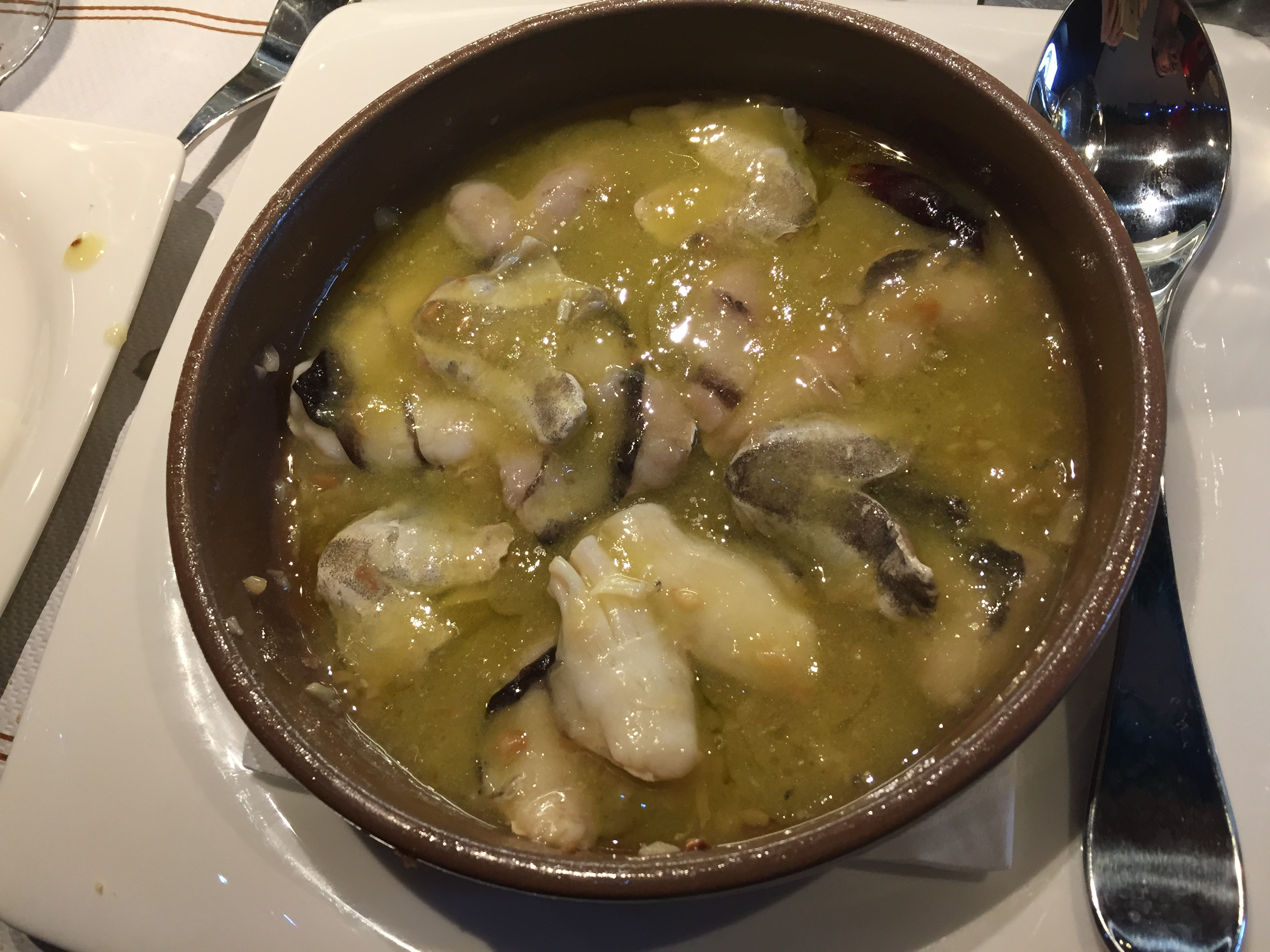
Kokotxas al pilpil, a traditional Basque dish made from the throats of hake or cod, cooked in a garlic and olive oil emulsion called pilpil.

The cuisine of the Basque Country has a wide and varied range of ingredients and preparations. Food and drinks are especially important in the Basque culture. Highlights include meat and fish dishes. Among fish, cod (bacalao) is produced in various preparations, such as bacalao al pil pil and bacalao a la vizcaína. Also popular are anchovies, bream, and bonito. Among the most famous dishes is changurro (stuffed king crab). Common meat dishes include beef steaks, pork loin with milk, fig leaf quail, and marinated goose.

Txakoli or chacolí (a white wine characterised by its high acidity and a lesser-than-average alcohol content) is a staple drink from the Basque Country, produced in Álava, Guipúzcoa and Biscay. Basque cider is popular following the apple harvest and is served in cider houses and bars.

=== Canary Islands ===
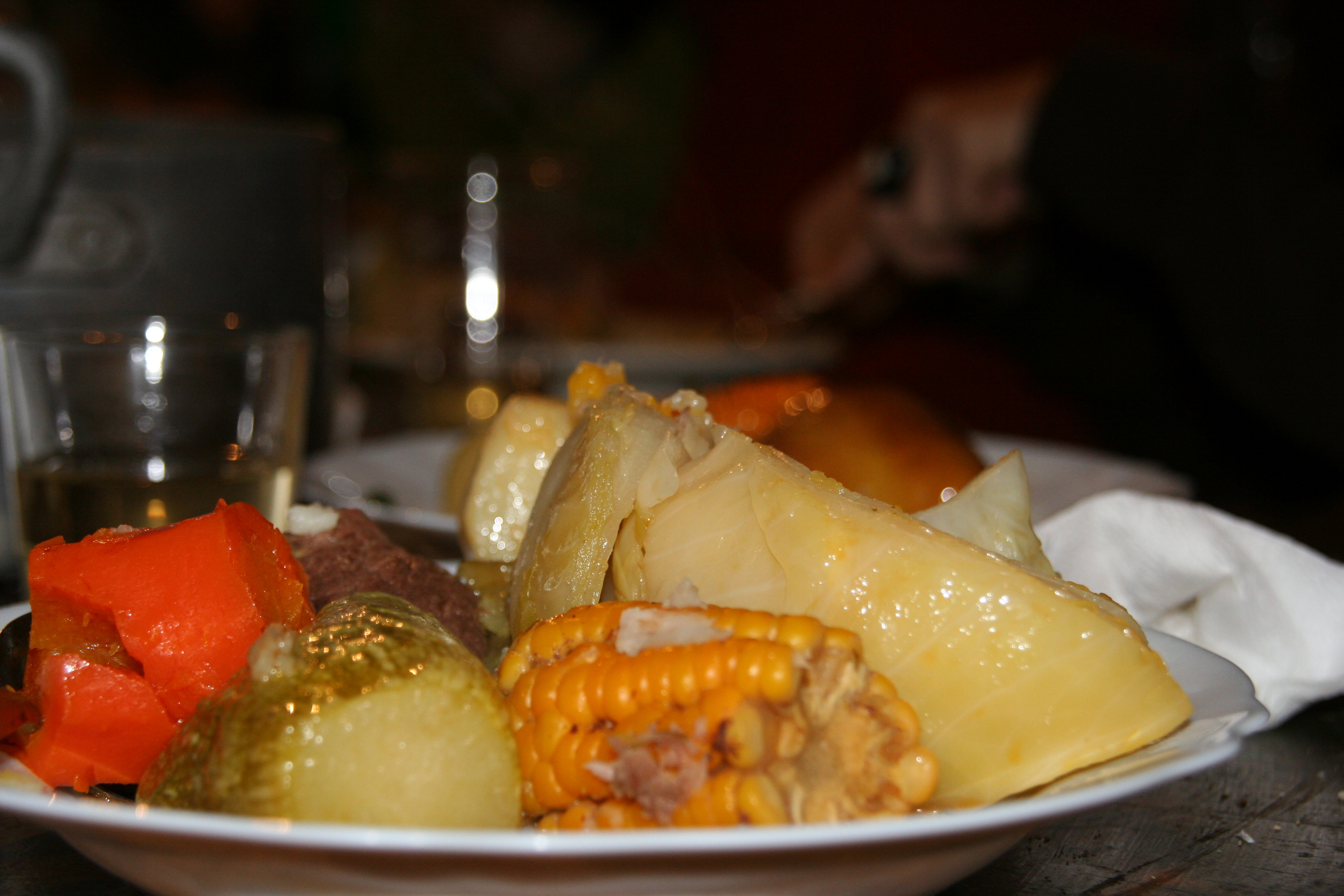
Dish of puchero canario, a traditional hearty stew from the Canary Islands made with various meats, vegetables, and chickpeas.

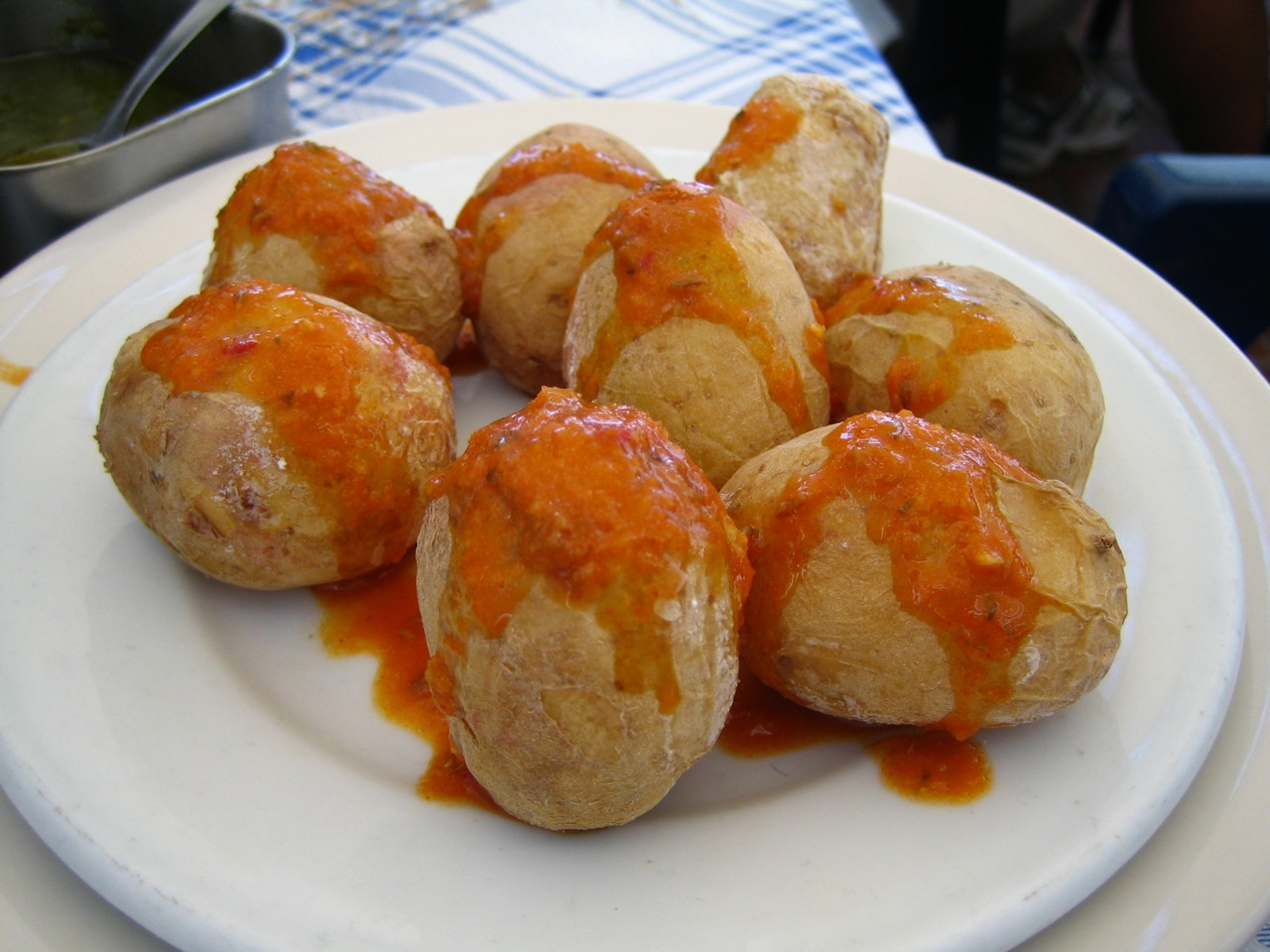
Papas arrugadas (Canarian wrinkly potatoes), a traditional Canarian dish of small potatoes boiled in salty water until wrinkled, typically served with spicy mojo rojo sauce.

The Canary Islands have a unique cuisine due to their geographical location in the Atlantic Ocean. The Canary Islands were part of the trading routes to the Americas, hence creating a melting pot of different culinary traditions. Fish (fresh or salted) and potatoes are among the most common staple foods in the islands. The consumption of cheese, fruits, and pork also characterizes Canarian cuisine. The islands' close proximity to continental Africa influences the climate and creates a range of warm temperatures that in modern times have fostered the agriculture of tropical and semitropical crops: bananas, yams, mangoes, avocados, and persimmons. These crops are heavily used in Canarian cuisine.

The aboriginal people, Guanches, based their diet on gofio (a type of flour made of different toasted grains), shellfish, and goat and pork products. Gofio is still consumed in the islands and has become part of the traditional cuisine.

A sauce called mojo is very common throughout the islands. It has been adapted and developed in many ways, so that it may complement various main dishes. Fish dishes usually require a "green mojo" made from coriander or parsley, while roasted meats require a red variety made from chilli peppers that are commonly known as mojo picón.

Some classic dishes in the Canary Islands include papas arrugadas, almogrote, frangollo, rabbit in salmorejo sauce, and stewed goat.

Some popular desserts are truchas (pastries filled with sweet potato or pumpkin), roasted gofio (a gofio-based dough with nuts and honey), príncipe Alberto (a mousse-like preparation with almonds, coffee, and chocolate), and quesillo (a variety of flan made with condensed milk).

Wineries are common in the islands. However, only Malvasia wine from Lanzarote has gained international recognition.

=== Cantabria ===
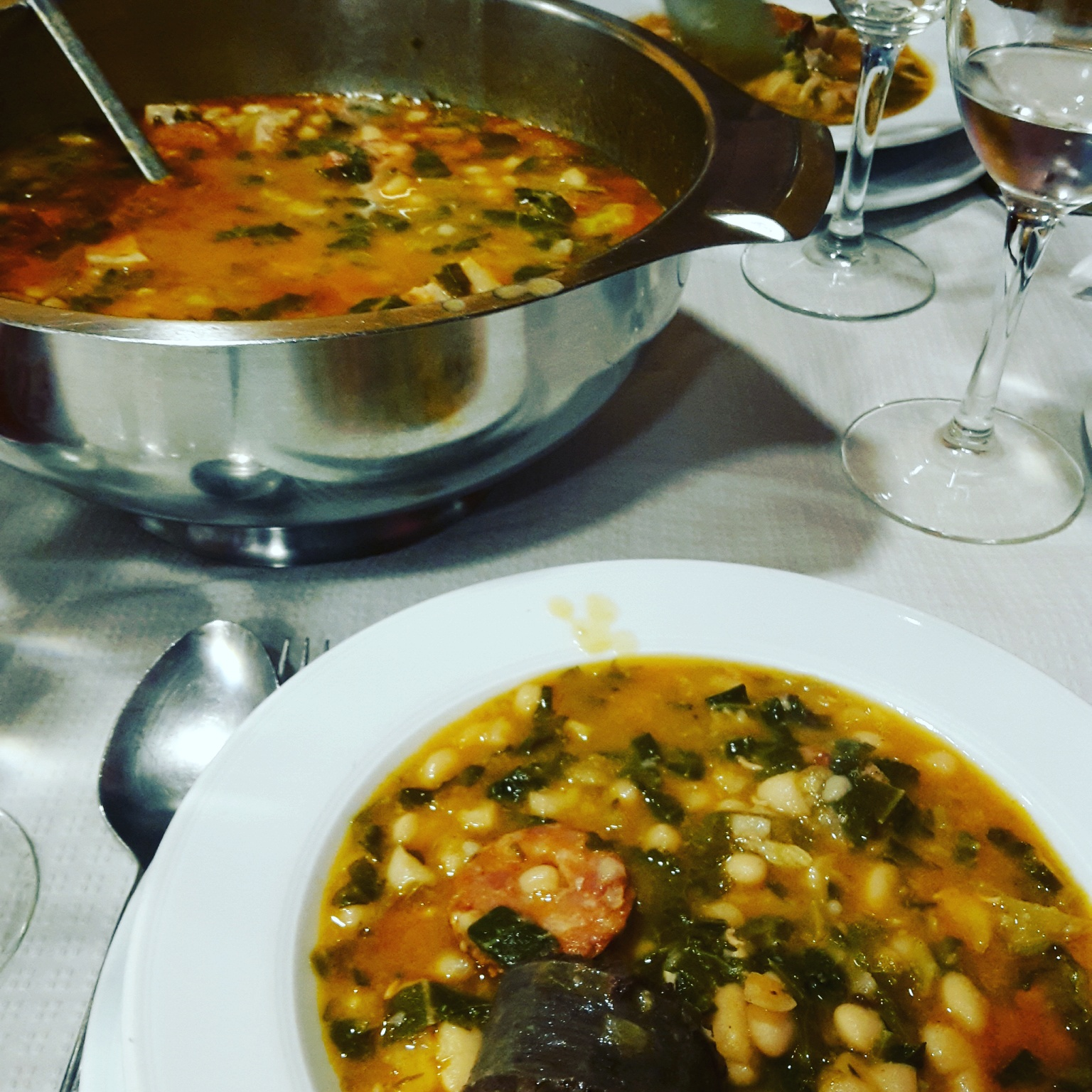
Cocido montañés, a traditional Cantabrian stew made with white beans, collard greens, and assorted pork products, typically served hot during colder months.

A popular Cantabrian dish is cocido montañés (highlander stew): a rich stew made with beans, cabbage, and pork. Seafood is widely used and bonito is present in the typical sorropotún or marmita de bonitu (tuna pot). Recognized quality meats include Tudanca veal and game meat.

Cantabrian pastries include sobaos and quesadas pasiegas. Dairy products include Cantabrian cream cheese, smoked cheeses, picón Bejes-Tresviso, and quesucos de Liébana.

As for alcohol, orujo is the Cantabrian pomace brandy. Cider (sidra) and chacoli wine are also favorites. Cantabria has two wines labelled denominación de origen calificada ('denomination of qualified origin'): Costa de Cantabria and Liébana.

=== Castile-La Mancha ===
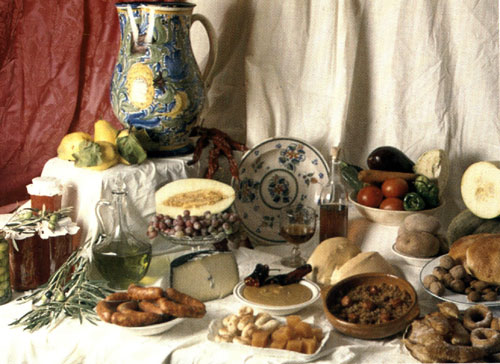
Traditional dishes from gastronomía manchega in Pedro Muñoz, Castile-La Mancha, featuring rustic preparations often based on local lamb, game, cheese, and seasonal vegetables.

In Castilla-La Mancha, the culinary habits reflect the origin of foods eaten by shepherds and peasants. Wheat and grains are a dominant product and ingredient—they are used in bread, soups, gazpacho manchego, migas, and porridge. One of the most abundant ingredients in Manchego cuisine is garlic, leading to dishes such as ajoarriero, ajo puerco, and ajo mataero.

Some traditional recipes are gazpacho manchego, pisto manchego, and migas ruleras. Also popular in this region is morteruelo, a kind of foie gras. Manchego cheese is also renowned.

Because its lands are dry, and thus unable to sustain large amounts of cattle living on grass, an abundance of small animals, such as rabbit and especially birds (pheasant, quail, partridge, squab), can be found. This has led to game meat being incorporated into traditional dishes, such as conejo al Ajillo (rabbit in garlic sauce), perdiz escabechada (marinated partridge) or huevos de codorniz (quail eggs).

=== Castile and León ===
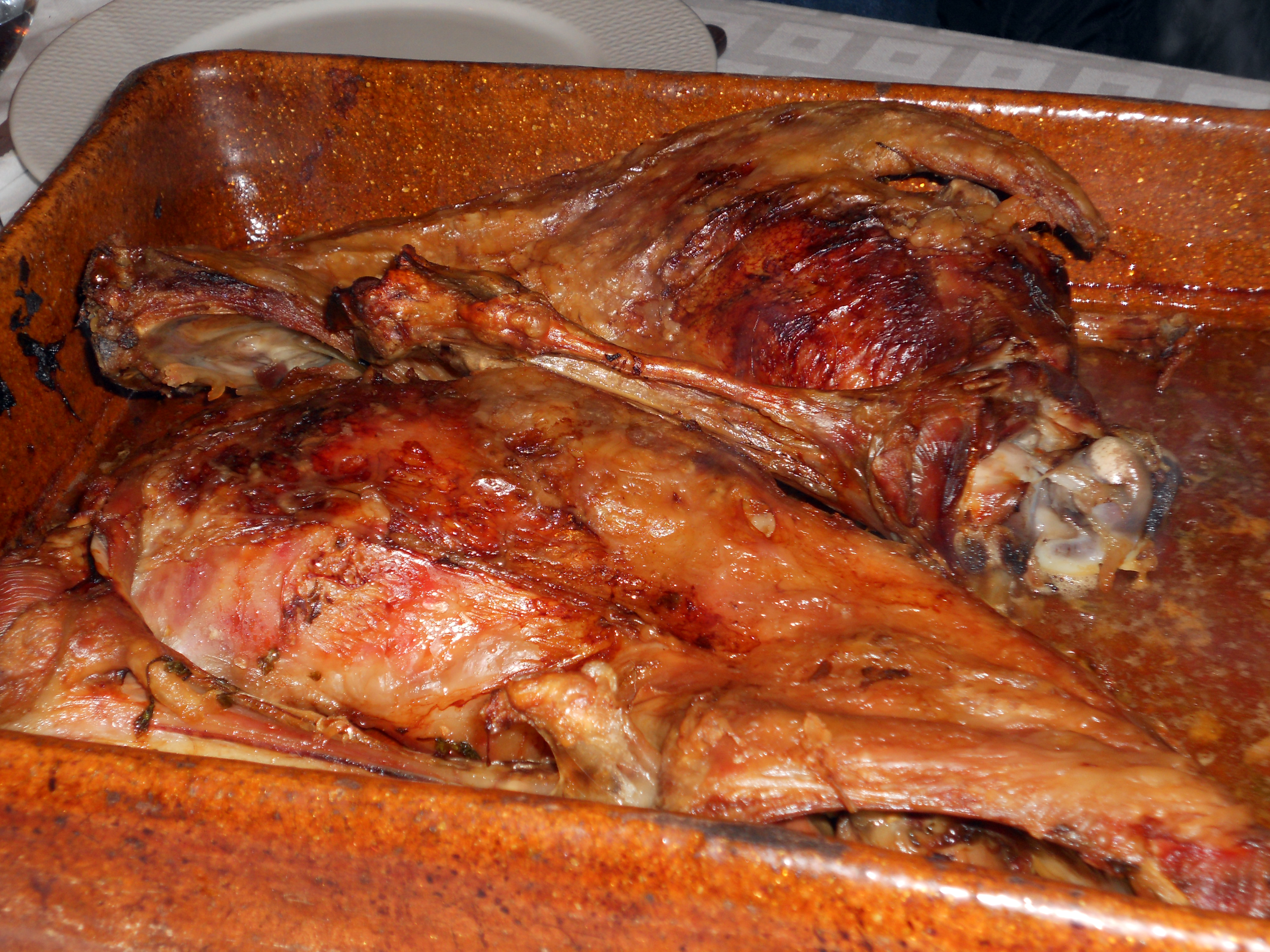
Traditional lechazo asado, a roasted milk-fed lamb dish typical of Castile and León, known for its tender meat and simple seasoning with salt, water, and olive oil.

In Castile and León, characteristic dishes include morcilla (a black pudding made with special spices), judión de la Granja, sopa de ajo (garlic soup), cochinillo asado (roast piglet), lechazo (roast lamb), and chuletón de Ávila (Ávila rib steak). Other foods include botillo del Bierzo, hornazo from Salamanca, jamón de Guijuelo (a cured ham from Guijuelo, Salamanca), salchicha de Zaratán, other sausages, Serrada cheese (made from sheep's milk), queso de Burgos, and Ribera del Duero wines.

Major wines in Castilian–Leonese cuisine include the robust wine of Toro, reds from Ribera del Duero, whites from Rueda, and clarets from Cigales.

=== Catalonia ===
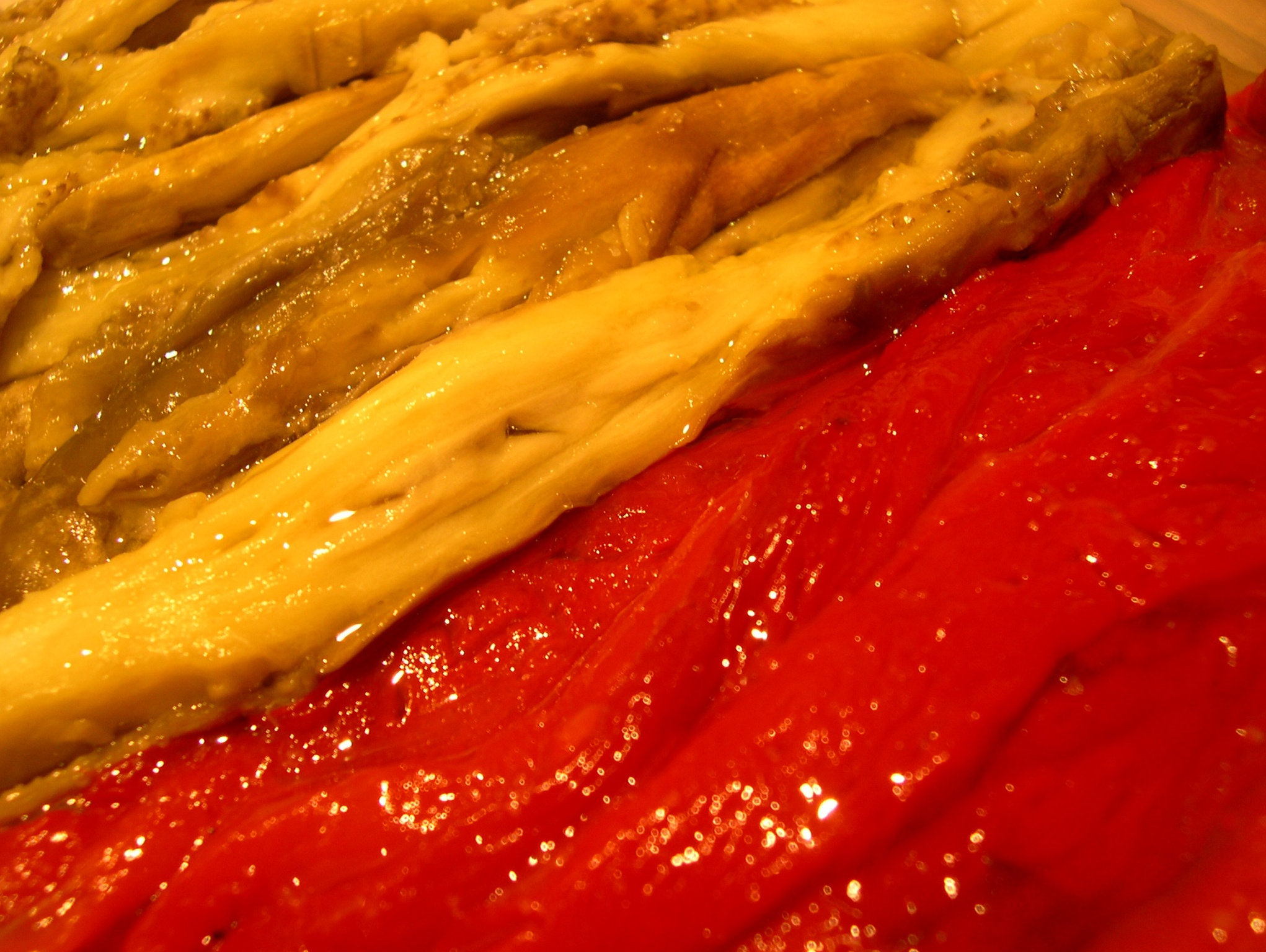
Escalivada, a traditional Catalan dish of grilled vegetables—typically eggplant, red bell pepper, onion, and tomato—served warm or cold, often with olive oil and anchovies or bread.

The extensive cuisine of Catalonia has rural origins and features foods from three climates: coastal, mountains, and the interiors. Some famous dishes include escudella, pa amb tomàquet, coca de recapte, samfaina, thyme soup, caragols a la llauna, and the bomba de Barceloneta. Notable sauces are romesco sauce, aioli, bouillabaisse of Catalan origin, and picada.

Cured pork cuisine includes botifarra (white and black) and the fuet of Vic. Fish dishes include suquet (fish stew), cod stew, and arròs negre. Among the vegetable dishes, the most famous are calçots and escalivada (roasted vegetables). Desserts include Catalan cream, carquinyolis, panellets, tortell, and neules.

=== Extremadura ===
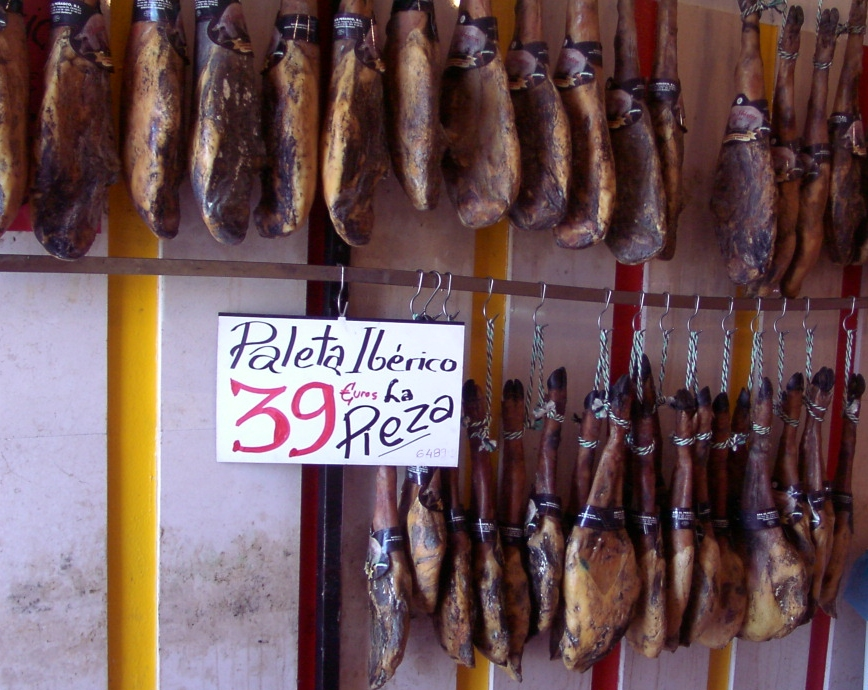
Legs of Jamón ibérico, a prized cured ham from Spain made from Iberian pigs, known for its rich flavor and marbled fat, typically aged for 24 to 36 months.

The cuisine of Extremadura is simple at heart, with dishes based on those prepared by shepherds. It is very similar to the cuisine of Castilla. Extremaduran cuisine is abundant in pork; it is said that the region is one of the best for breeding pigs in Spain thanks to the acorns that grow in their fields. Iberian pig herds raised in the fields of Montánchez are characterized by dark skin and thin legs. This breed of pig is found exclusively in Southwestern Iberia, both in Spain and Portugal. Iberian pork products such as sausages are common and often added to stews (cocido extremeño), as well as cachuela (pork liver pâté seasoned with paprika, garlic and other spices).

Other meat dishes include lamb stew or goat stew (caldereta de cordero and caldereta de cabrito). Additionally, meat dishes can include game meats, such as wild boar, partridge, pheasant, or venison.

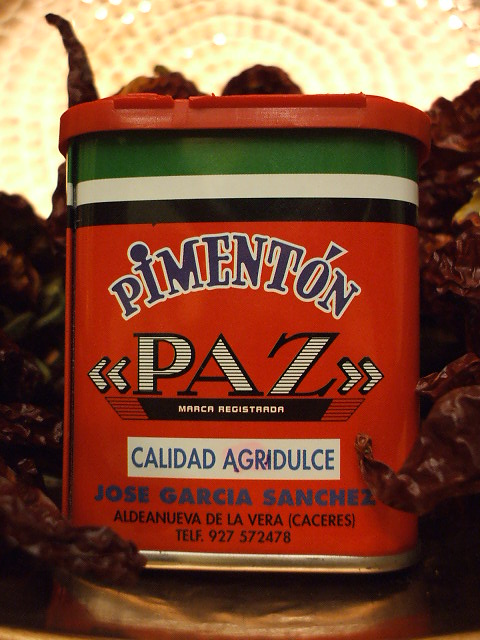
Pimentón de la Vera, a smoked paprika from La Vera in Extremadura, Spain, known for its distinctive aroma and flavor, essential in many traditional Spanish dishes.

Distinctive cheeses from the region include the so-called quesos de torta (sheep milk cheeses typically curdled with the infusion of thistle). Both the torta of La Serena and the torta of El Casar enjoy a protected designation of origin. Among the desserts are leche frita, perrunilla, and pestiños (fritters), as well as many sweets that have their origins in convents.

Cod preparations are well-known, and tench is among the most traditional freshwater fish, with fish and vegetable dishes such as moje de peces or escarapuche.

Soups are often bread-based and are served in both hot and cold forms. Pennyroyal mint is sometimes used to season gazpachos or soups such as sopa de poleo. Extremaduran ajoblanco (ajoblanco extremeño) is a cold soup, which is different from Andalusian ajoblanco since it contains egg yolk in the emulsion and vegetables but no almonds.

The northeastern comarca of La Vera produces pimentón de la Vera, a smoked paprika highly valued all over Spain and extensively used in Extremaduran cuisine.

The region is also known for its vino de pitarra tradition (homemade wine made in small earthenware vessels).

=== Galicia ===
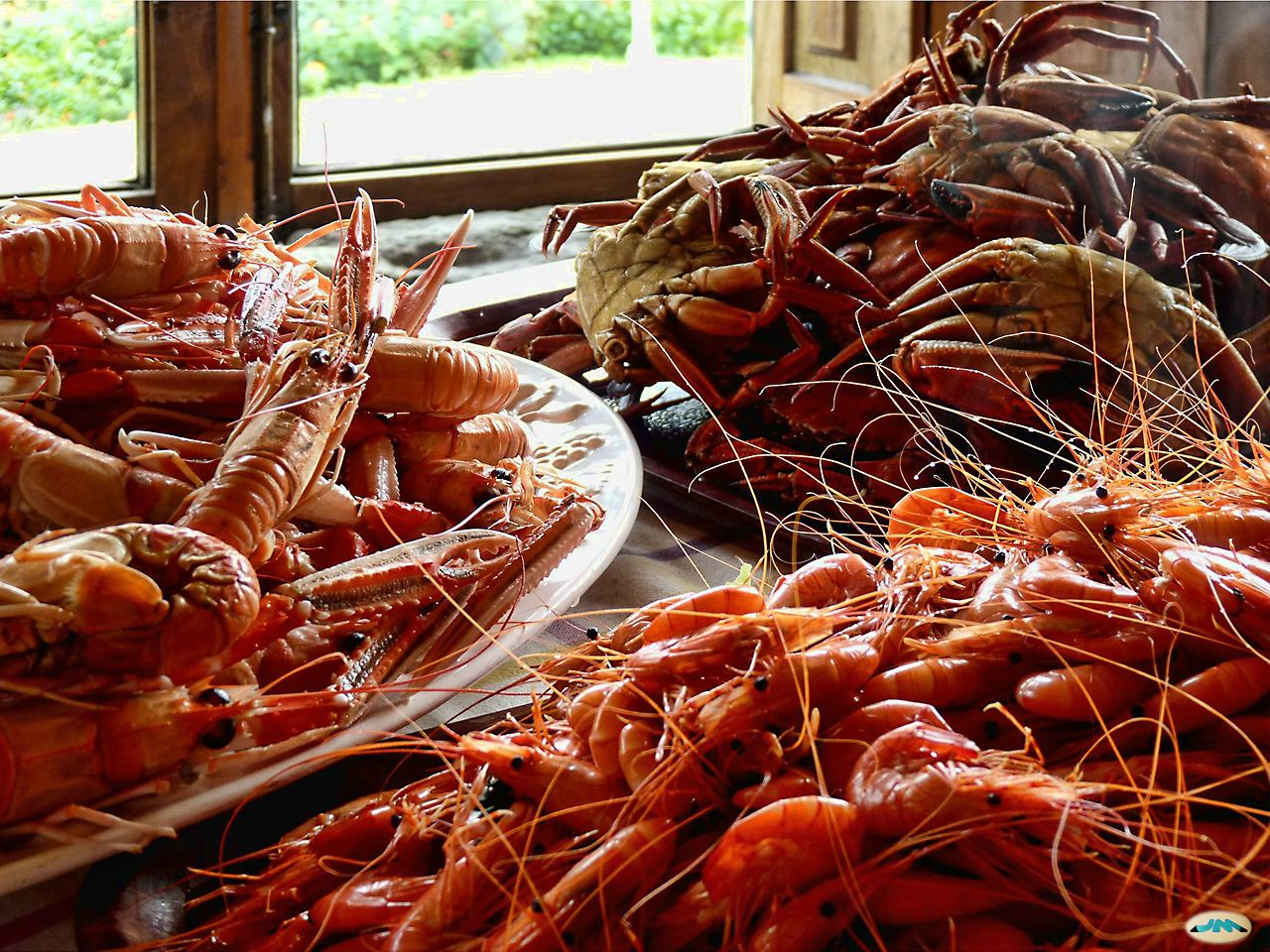
Mariscada], a Spanish-style plateau de fruits de mer, typically featuring an assortment of steamed or grilled shellfish such as prawns, mussels, clams, and crab.

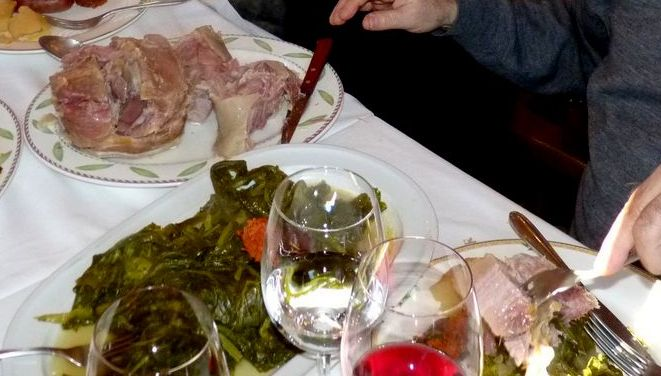
Lacón con grelos, a traditional Galician dish made with cured pork shoulder (lacón), turnip greens (grelos), chorizo, and potatoes, typically served in winter.

Galician cuisine is well known throughout Spain because of emigration to other regions. Similar to neighbouring Asturias, Galicia shares some culinary traditions in stews and soups with the Celtic nations of Atlantic Europe. One of the most noted Galician dishes is soup. Also notable in this region is pork with turnip tops, a popular component of the Galician carnival meal laconadas. Another recipe is caldo de castañas (a chestnut broth), which is commonly consumed during winter. Pork products are also popular. Cattle raising is very common in Galicia, consequently red meat is consumed often, typically with potatoes.

The simplicity and authenticity of Galician cooking methods were praised in the early 20th century by the prominent gastronome Manuel Puga e Parga (also known as Picadillo), who praised dishes such as lacón con grelos or caldeiradas (fish stew), in opposition to the perceived sophistication of the French cuisine.

Galician seafood dishes are well-known and rich in variety. Among these are empanadas, octopus, scallops, crab, and barnacles. In the city of Santiago de Compostela, located along an ancient pilgrim trail from the Pyrenees, it was customary for travelers to eat scallops upon first arriving in the city.

Among the many dairy products is queso de tetilla.

The queimadas (a folkloric preparation of orujo) consists of mixing alcoholic beverages with peels of orange or lemon, sugar or coffee beans, prepared in a nearly ritual ceremony involving the flambé of the beverage. Sweets that are famous throughout the Iberian Peninsula are the tarta de Santiago and filloas (crêpes).

=== La Rioja ===
La Rioja is recognized for its use of meats such as pork and cold cuts, which are produced after the traditional slaughter. Lamb is perhaps the second most popular meat product in this region (chuletillas al sarmiento). Veal is common in mountainous areas. The most famous dishes are Rioja style potatoes and fritada. Another well-known dish is caparrones (Rioja stew). Lesser-known dishes are almuerzo del Santo and ajo huevo (garlic eggs). Pimientos asados (roasted peppers) is a notable vegetable dish.

La Rioja is famously known in Spain for its red wine, so most of these dishes are served with wine. Rioja wine has designated origin status.

=== Madrid ===
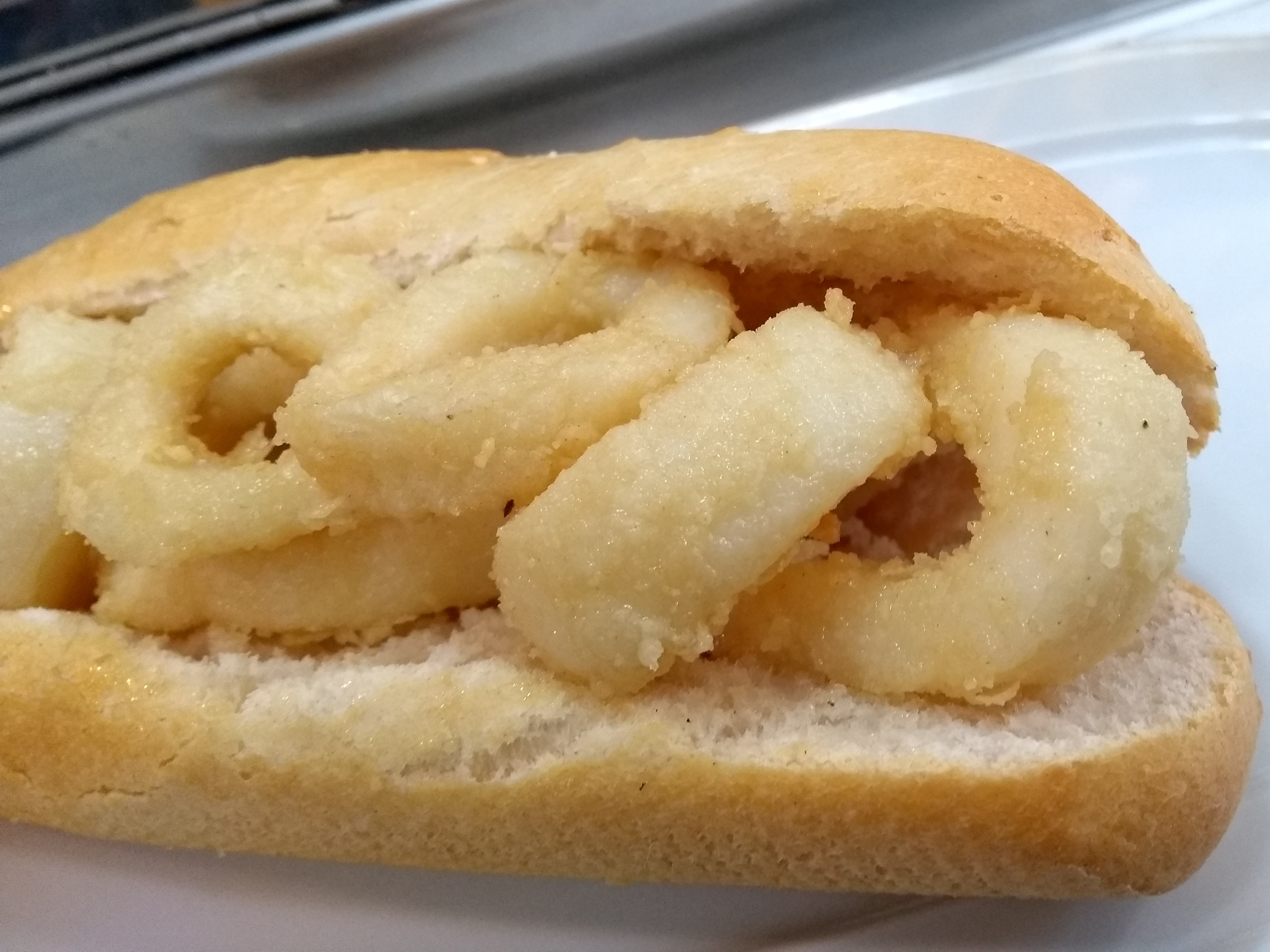
Bocadillo de calamares, a popular fast-food sandwich in Madrid, made with fried squid rings served in a crusty baguette.

Madrid did not have a special regional identity before 1561, when king Philip II made it the capital of Spain. Since then, due to immigration, many of Madrid's culinary dishes have been made from modifications to dishes from other Spanish regions. Madrid is home to Sobrino de Botín, the oldest continuously operating restaurant in the world, according to the Guinness Book of Records.

=== Murcia ===
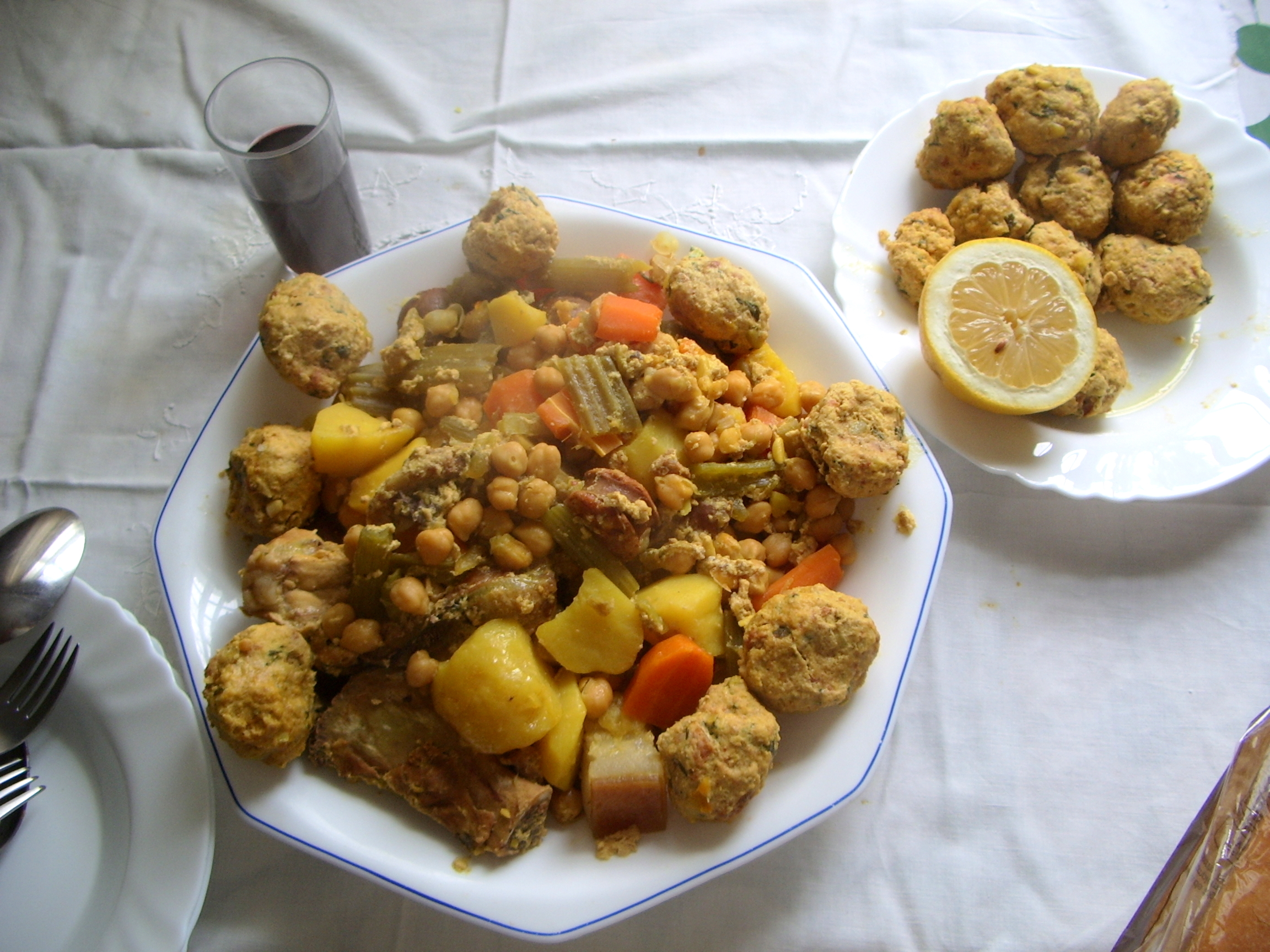
Cocido de pelotas, a traditional Murcian stew featuring meatballs (pelotas) made with minced meat, breadcrumbs, and spices, served with vegetables, chickpeas, and sometimes noodles.

The cuisine of the region of Murcia can be said to have two versions, one linked to the huerta (irrigated areas) and another one closer to Manchego cuisine. The region of Murcia is famous for its varied fruit production. Among the most outstanding dishes are tortilla murciana, zarangollo, mojete, aubergine a la crème, empanadas and pipirrana. A typical sauce of this area is ajo cabañil, used to accompany meat dishes.

Regional dishes include michirones (beans cooked with bay leaves, hot peppers and garlic), olla gitana, cocido murciano con pelotas, and sopa de mondongo.

Some meat products from Murcia are morcilla (black pudding), which is flavored with oregano, and pastel murciano, made with ground beef. Among fish and seafood preparations are the dorada a la sal, prawns from the Mar Menor, and baked octopus. Rice dishes are common and include caldero, arroz empedrado, paella Valenciana (rice with rabbit and snails), arroz de escribano, and arroz viudo.

Confectionery products include exploradores and pastel de Cierva, typical in Murcia gastronomy and found in almost every pastry shop in Murcia. They are both sweet and savoury at the same time. Paparajotes is another dessert, made from lemon leaves.

This region also has wine appellations of origin, such as the wines from Jumilla, Bullas and Yecla.

=== Navarra ===
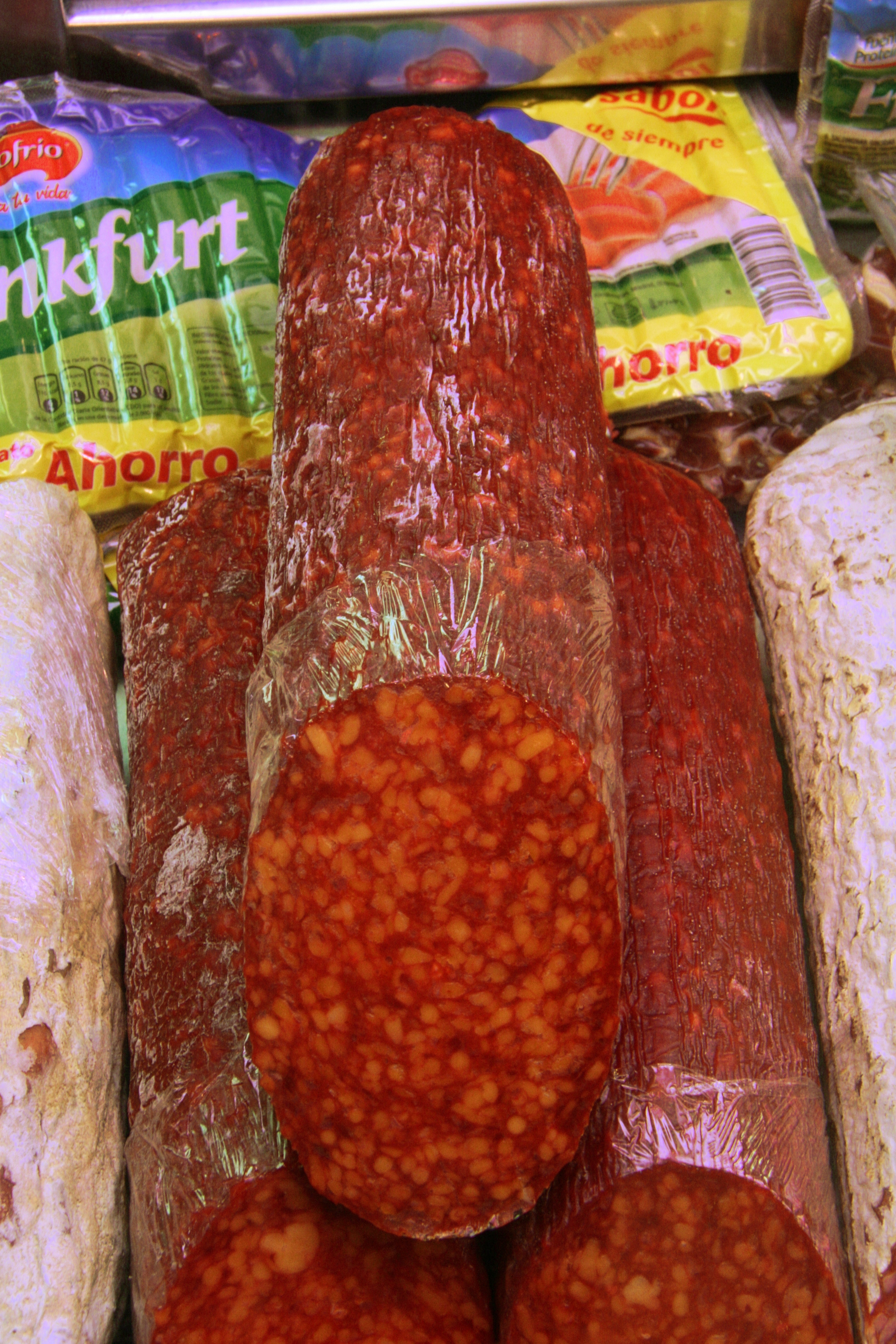
Chorizo de Pamplona, a cured, spicy pork sausage from the Navarre region of Spain, known for its coarse texture and smoky flavor.

The gastronomy of Navarra has many similarities with Basque cuisine. Some of its best-known dishes are trucha a la navarra (Navarra-style trout), ajoarriero, cordero en chilindrón, and relleno. There are also recipes such as Carlists eggs (omelet).

Salted products are common and include chorizo de Pamplona, bacalao al ajoarriero, stuffing and sausage. The lamb and beef have, at present, designations of origin. Some dairy products are Roncal cheese, curd, and Idiazabal cheese. Typical alcoholic drinks include claret and pacharán.

=== Valencia ===
The cuisine of Valencia has two aspects: rural and coastal. One of Valencia's most famous preparations is paella, a traditional rice dish made with vegetables and meats such as rabbit and chicken. It is cooked in a wide, shallow, circular pan, which is also where the dish gets its name. Other rice dishes such as arroz con costra, arròs negre, fideuà, arròs al forn, and arròs amb fesols i naps ('rice with beans and turnips') are also local to the region.

Coastal towns supply the region with fish, leading to popular dishes like all i pebre (literally, 'garlic and paprika'), typical of the Albufera.

The desserts in this region include coffee liqueur, chocolate Alicante, arnadí, and horchata, the last two being of Muslim origin. Notably, during Christmas, nougat is made in Alicante and Jijona. Another well-known dessert is peladillas (similar to sugar plums, almonds wrapped in a thick layer of caramel).

== Notable Spanish chefs ==
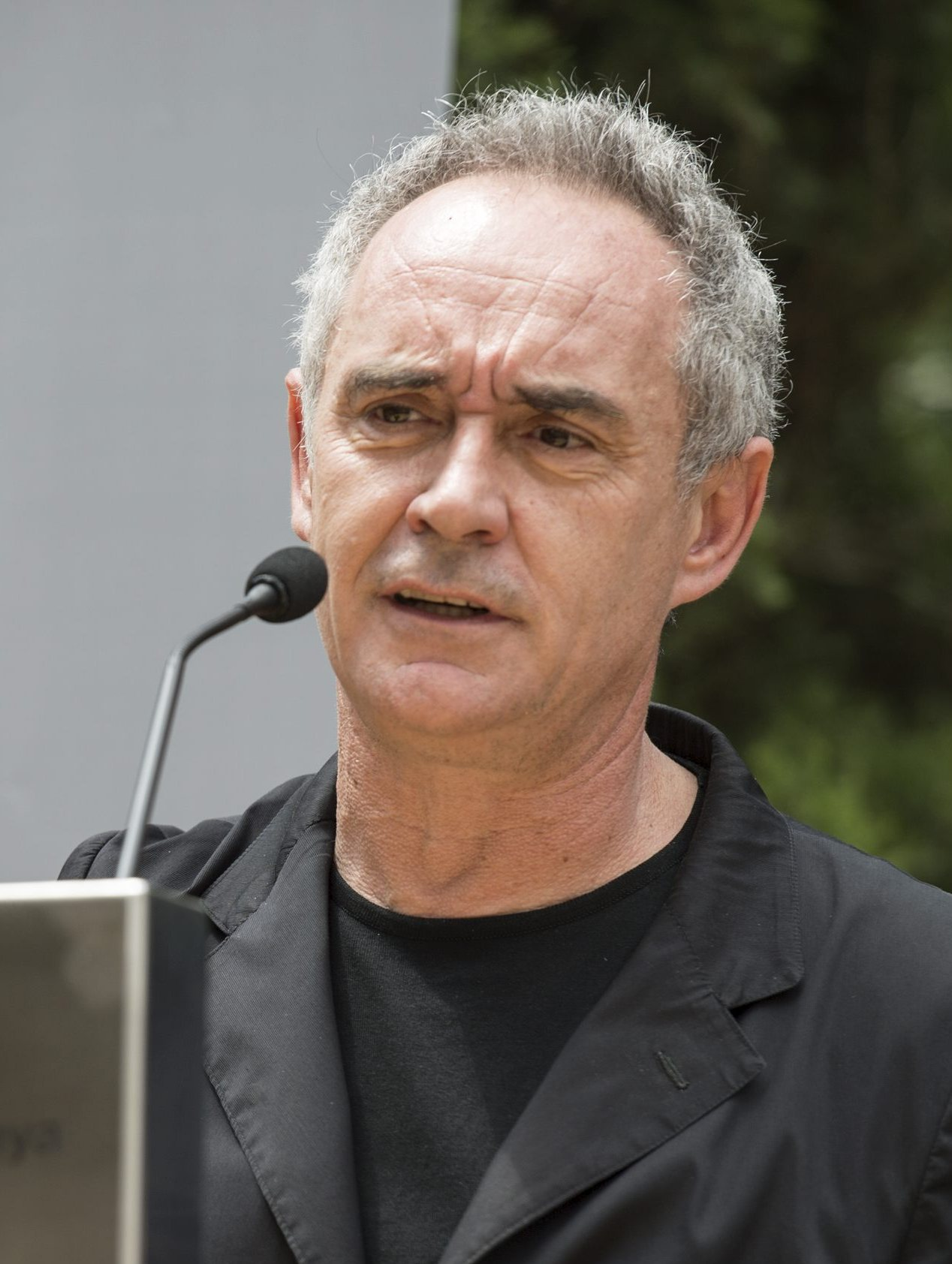
Spanish chef Ferran Adrià, renowned for his innovative contributions to molecular gastronomy and modern Catalan cuisine.

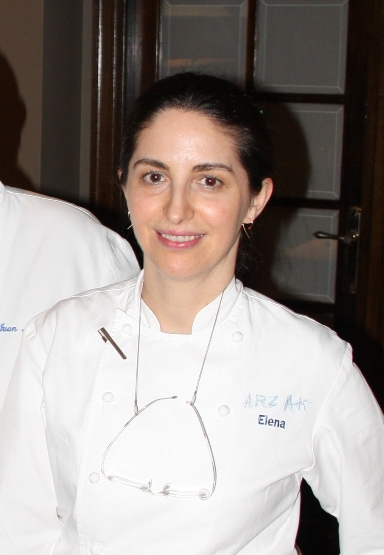
Spanish chef Elena Arzak, head chef of the three-Michelin-star restaurant Arzak in San Sebastián, known for her innovative Basque cuisine.

- Ferran Adrià
- Juan Mari Arzak
- Santi Santamaría
- Martín Berasategui
- Carme Ruscalleda
- José Andrés – (restaurants: Minibar by José Andrés, Washington D.C.) – Andrés hosts Made in Spain on PBS.
- Karlos Arguiñano – celebrity television chef
- Sergi Arola – (restaurants: La Broché, Arola, and Sergi Arola Gastro)
- Penelope Casas – New York-born cookbook author
- Carlos Dominguez Cidon – recipient of the "Premio Alimentos" award in 1999 and Michelin Guiding Star award in 2004; author of eight books
- María Mestayer de Echagüe – also known as "Marquesa de Parabere", the author of a two-volume cooking encyclopaedia entitled La Cocina Completa
- Ángel Muro – a 19th-century food expert and author of the book Practicón
- Simone and Ines Ortega – authors of 1080 recetas (1080 Recipes)
- Manuel María Puga y Parga – an early-20th century food expert and author of La cocina práctica
- Joan Roca, Jordi Roca i Fontané, and Josep Roca i Fontané – (restaurants: "El Celler de Can Roca", "Rocambolesc", "Can Roca", "Mas Marroch", and "Cap Roig" in the province of Girona; "Roca Barcelona" in the province of Barcelona) – Three Michelin stars in 2009. In 2013, El Celler de Can Roca was selected as the best restaurant in the world by Restaurant magazine.

== See also ==
- Early impact of Mesoamerican goods in Iberian society
- List of Spanish desserts
- List of Spanish dishes
- List of Spanish soups and stews
- Agriculture in Spain
- List of Spanish cheeses
- Bread culture in Spain
- List of cuisines
- Mediterranean cuisine
- European cuisine
- Filipino cuisine
- Romani cuisine
