= Menudo Gitano =

Andalusian stew made from tripe

The "Menudo Gitano" (also called Andalusian tripe) is a dish prepared from tripe in Andalusian cuisine, this dish uses chickpeas in its preparation. It is a winter dish, served hot and traditionally in a clay pot. This recipe is already mentioned by Juan de Altamira in his book "The Newest Kitchen Art", in the early nineteenth century.

== Features ==
This dish often used to the chickpeas ratio of four to one, i.e., that for every kilo means chickpea two pounds of tripe are added. In preparing this dish during cooking, tripe dwindle as the chickpeas grow. The dish is usually prepared with a combination of tripe, chickpeas, pig’s trotter, ham or bacon, onions, garlic, parsley, bay leaves, salt, pepper, and a sofrito made from onions, tomatoes, morcilla, chorizo, and olive oil. the ingredients are cooked until soft, then mixed with the sofrito in order to create a rich sauce. Menudo gitano is served in a shallow dish with the morcilla sausage laid on top. During cooking butter is often used colored. Interestingly, the tripe is most abundant after Sevilla’s bullring has hosted a bullfight. It is served hot in a clay pot.
