= Clipp Center =

Building in Taguig, Philippines

- Interactive map of the Clipp Center area

General information
- Location: 11th Avenue corner 39th Street, Bonifacio Global City, Taguig City, Philippines
- Coordinates: 14°33′33″N 121°03′22″E

Technical details
- Floor count: 12
- Floor area: 8,500 square meters (91,000 sq ft)

Design and construction
- Developer: Clipp Machenson's Holdings Inc.

Clipp Center is a 12-story mixed-use Class B building located at 11th Avenue corner 39th Street, Bonifacio Global City, Taguig City. An office/commercial type of property, Clipp Center is known for its design, which serves as an antithesis to the typical office building design. The building started construction in May 2011 and has a gross floor area of approximately 8,500 sq.m. It was developed by Clipp Machenson's Holdings Inc., a company owned by Pablito Calma and its design was done by Eduardo Calma. Clipp Center is currently managed by Jones Lang LaSalle and was previously managed by KMC MAG Group, an international associate of Savills.

== Design and features ==
Clipp Center, with a height of 57.80 metres (189.6 ft), is quite short compared to most of its neighboring structures. Unlike other buildings that uses the usual glass material, Clipp Center has a metal cladding added to the facade. It also has operable awning windows to allow natural ventilation.

== Establishments ==
Clipp Centre is also known as the home of Vask, a restaurant specializing in traditional Basque cuisine, located on the 5th floor.
