= Akelarre (restaurant) =

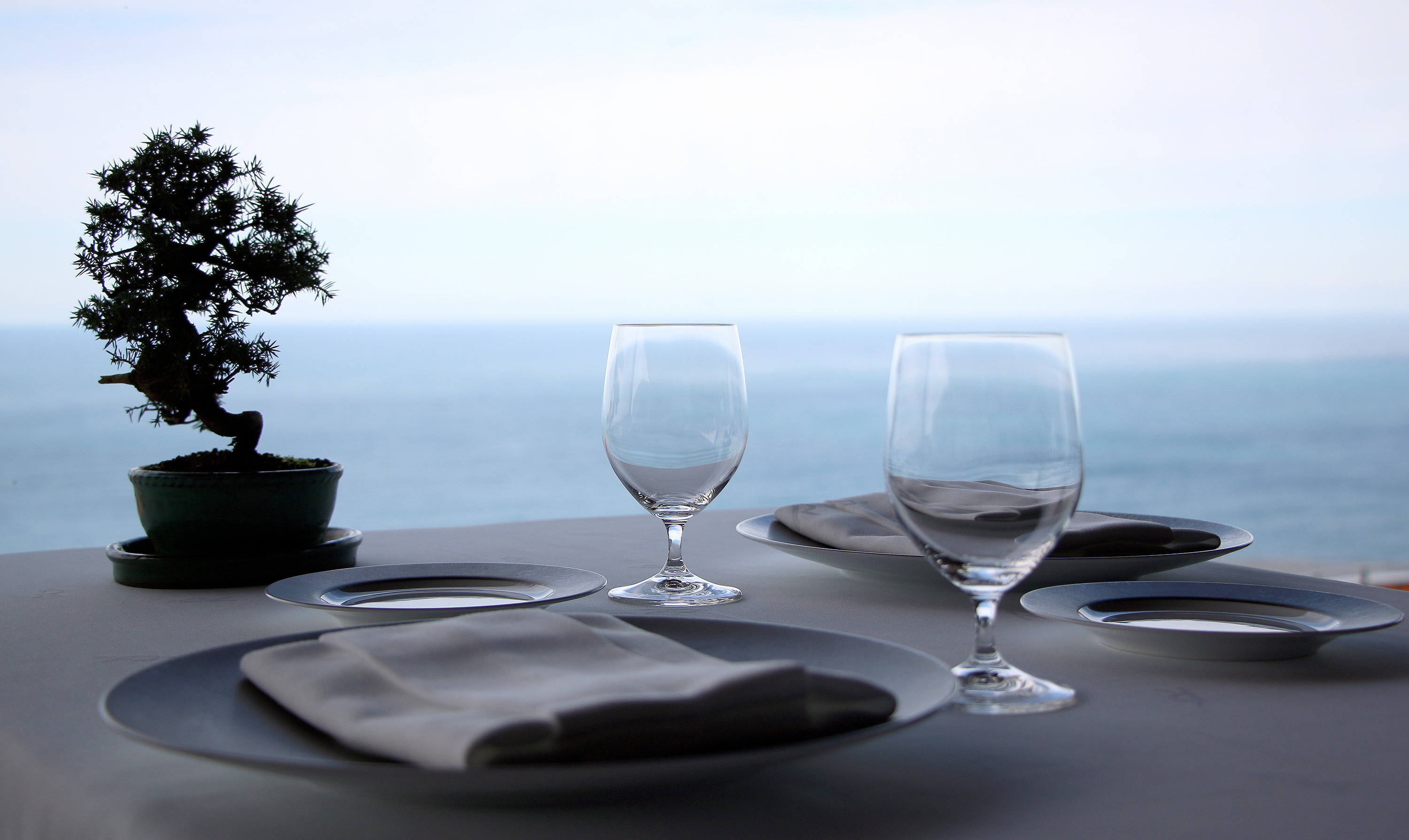
- Interior view of Akelarre

- The location of the restaurant in Spain

Restaurant information
- Head chef: Pedro Subijana
- Rating: (Michelin Guide)
- Location: Aita Orkolaga Pasealekua, 56, Igeldo, San Sebastián, Basque Country, 20008, Spain
- Coordinates: 43.307776°N 2.043173°W
- Website: www.akelarre.net

Akelarre is a modern Basque restaurant founded in 1974 by Pedro Subijana, and located in Igeldo quarter of San Sebastián, Gipuzkoa, Spain. The restaurant is known for its local seafood. It has achieved three Michelin stars.

== About ==
Since 2017, it has its own 5-star hotel with 22 rooms with views of the Cantabrian Sea, and the Oteiza Restaurant, named after the famous sculptor that frequented the Akelarre Restaurant. Its wine cellar has more than 650 wines of reference from Spain and all around the world.

== See also ==
- Basque cuisine
- List of Basque restaurants
- List of Michelin-starred restaurants in Spain
