= Choricero peppers =

Variety of red pepper

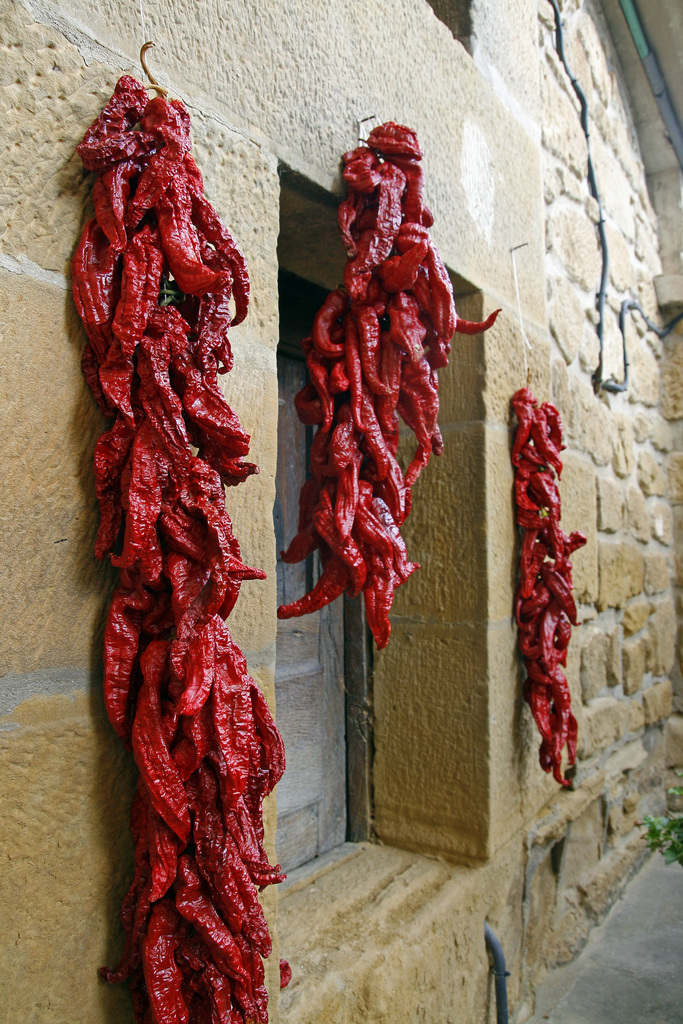
Pimiento peppers hanging from the outside of a house.

Choricero peppers (Spanish: pimiento choricero) are a variety of red pepper (themselves a variety of the American species, Capsicum annuum) that are dehydrated for preservation. They have become part of Spanish culture, so much so that their hydrated pulps are simply kept in glass jars for aesthetic purposes. A similar variety, known as peperoni cruschi, is cultivated in the Italian region of Basilicata.

== Culinary uses ==
It is common to see these peppers hanging in Spanish kitchens. The drying allows them to last much longer in the open than raw pepper. They are hydrated a few hours before their culinary use for the purpose of extracting their intense red pulp. Their characteristic flavor made them popular in many dishes such as meats and stews of fish, vegetables, and meat, among others. They can also be dried, ground and used as a form of paprika.

== Dishes ==
- Alongside onion, it is the main ingredient in salsa vizcaína, the base of bacalao a la vizcaína, and marmitako.
- Choricero peppers are used in sukalki, a Basque meat stew.

Choricero peppers should not be used as a replacement for ñora, as the flavors are drastically different, and may result in a dish that does not taste good, if not just unexpected. Even though ñora is another sun-dried pepper, it is rounder in shape, smaller in size and sweeter in flavor than choricero peppers.

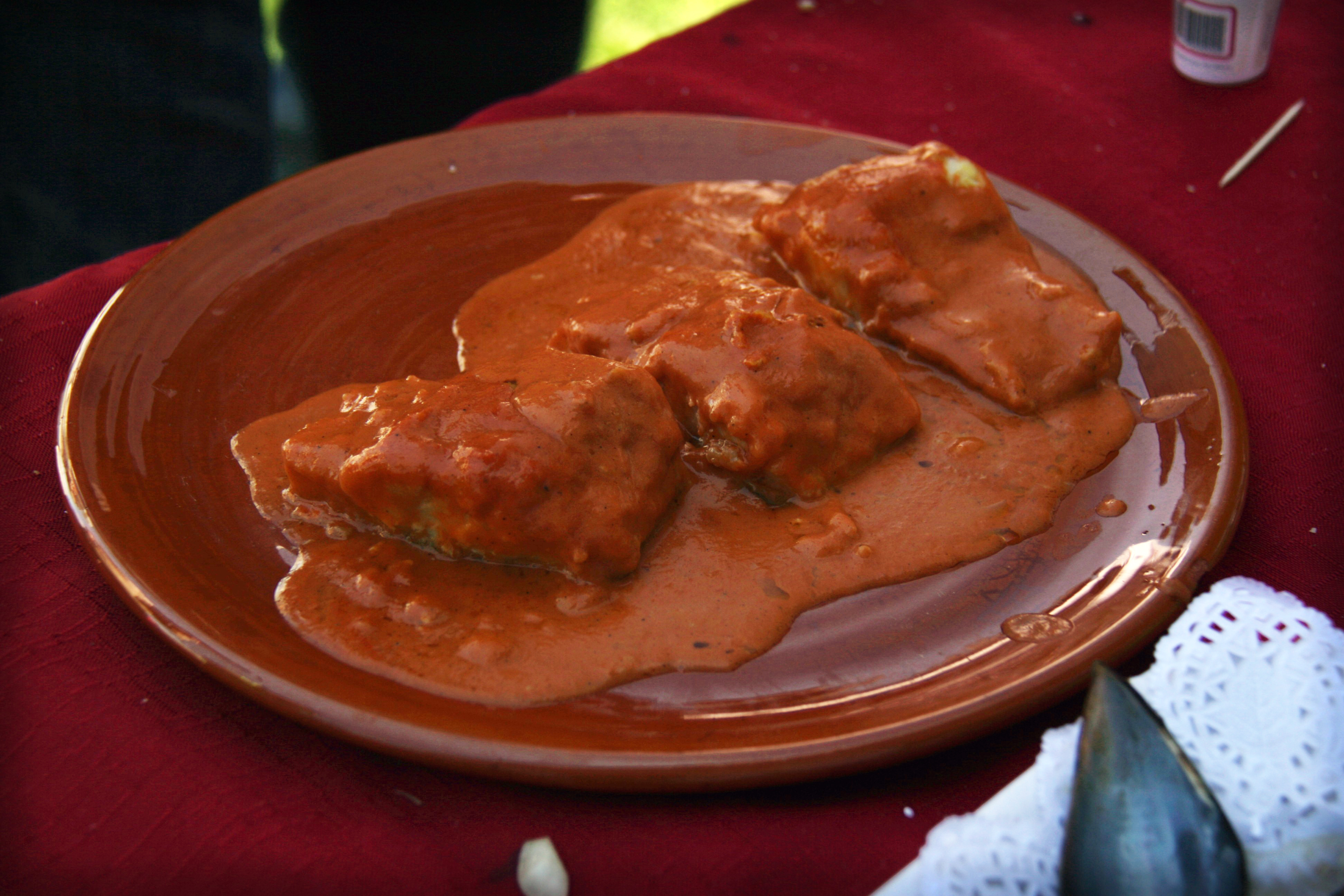
Bacalao a la Vizcaína in a sauce made of choricero peppers

== See also ==
- Capsicum annuum
- Peperone crusco
- In spite of their names, chorizo is spiced with ground pimentón instead of directly choricero peppers.
