= Karlos Arguiñano =

Spanish chef

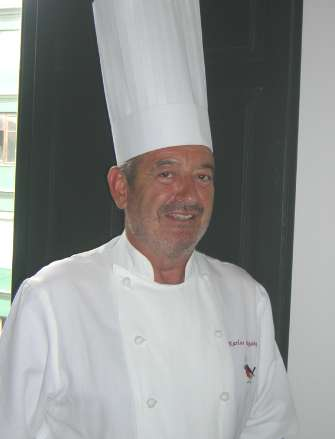
- Born: Karlos Arguiñano Urkiola; September 6, 1948 (age 76); Beasain (Gipuzkoa), Spain
- Education: Escuela de Hostelería del Hotel Euromar
- Culinary career
- Cooking style: New Basque cuisine
- Television show(s): El menú de cada día El sábado cocino yo Karlos Arguiñano en tu cocina
- Website: http://www.karlosnet.com

Karlos Arguiñano Urkiola (born September 6, 1948) is a Spanish chef, popular TV presenter and producer, and Basque pelota businessman.

His devotion to cuisine started when he was a child and helped at home because he was the eldest of four siblings and had a disabled mother.

Before beginning his training in the field of cooking, he worked for CAF, a rail car manufacturer at Beasain. When he was 17 years old, he decided to take part in a course at the Escuela de Hostelería del Hotel Euromar where, over three years, he was taught the main principles of cooking by Luis Irizar. There he met some people who have gone on to achieve great success in the world of cuisine, such as Pedro Subijana and Ramón Roteta.

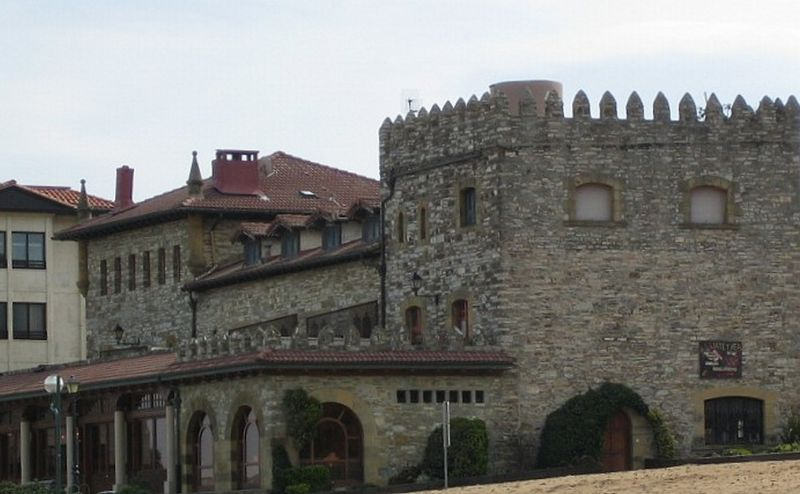
Karlos Arguiñano's restaurant

Arguiñano has had a hotel-restaurant on the beach at Zarautz since 1978.

He was one of the first TV chefs in Spain with his cooking show, La cocina de Karlos Arguiñano, first on Euskal Telebista, later on Televisión Española, Argentine ATC, back in Spain with Telecinco and, since September 2010 on Antena 3. Arguiñano combines recipe preparation with tips, jokes and amateur singing. His catchphrase is Rico, rico y con fundamento ("Tasty, tasty and with nutritional value") and his trademark is the use of parsley. His sister Eva Arguiñano has also appeared on TV, usually in the dessert section of the show.

He has taken over control of the show through his production company Asegarce. Asegarce also controls a big part of the professional Basque pelota business and is one of the owning companies of the TV channel La Sexta.

== Filmography ==
Karlos Arguiñano has participated in some films.

- El rey de la Granja (2002), directed by Carlos Zabala and Gregorio Muro
- Año Mariano (2000), directed by Karra Elejalde and Fernando Guillén Cuervo
- Airbag (1997), directed by Juanma Bajo Ulloa

== Curiosities ==
In 2005, the chef Manu Piñero (Karlos Arguiñano Aiala Gastronomic School's executive chef), has participated on behalf of Karlos Arguiñano in the first cook work days of Cocina Fusión Vasco-Canaria by the city hall of La Orotava and managed by the Canarian chef Alberto Fortes, collaborating with several basque chefs.
