= Luis Irizar =

Spanish chef (1930–2021)

Luis Irizar Zamora
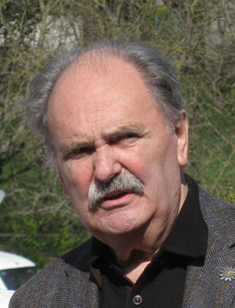
- Born: 30 May 1930; Havana, Cuba
- Died: 9 December 2021 (aged 91); San Sebastián, Spain
- Culinary career
- Cooking style: New Basque cuisine
- Website: www.escuelairizar.com

Luis Irizar Zamora (30 May 1930 – 9 December 2021) was one of the founding members of the New Basque Cuisine.

== Early years ==
Born to parents from San Sebastián, he had strong ties to the city and started his career as a chef in the Hotel María Cristina. During this early period he also worked at the Hotel Azaldegui in San Sebastián, the Restaurant Royal Monceau in Paris and the Hilton in London.

== The catering school years ==
In 1976, Irizar opened the Escuela de Hostelería del Hotel Euromar in Zarautz, then the first catering school in the Basque Country. This school over the years has produced some of the most renowned chefs of the new Basque cuisine movement in the Basque Country, amongst them Karlos Arguiñano, José Ramón Elizondo, Ramón Roteta, and Pedro Subijana.

== Later career and death ==
After spells of working in Madrid and running the Restaurante Irizar, he moved back to San Sebastián, this time to found the Luis Irizar Sukaldaritza Eskola ('Luis Irizar School of Cooking') in 1993.

He died on 9 December 2021, at the age of 91.
