= Sukalki =

Basque stew

Sukalki is a typical dish of Basque cuisine. It is typically a beef or beef blood sausage stew or casserole with potatoes and other vegetables. It is a complete meal that can be served with no side dishes but only bread.

The dish is the focus of multiple cooking competitions.

== Ingredients ==
Sukalki consists of meat, onion, carrot, choricero peppers, peas, potato, broth, oil, and garlic, with salt and sauce to taste.

== Importance ==
According to El Espagnol, sukalki is the most popular potato and meat stew in Basque cuisine.

In Basque cultural celebrations, it is customary to hold cooking competitions, wherein sukalki is often used as the standard meal to be made.

The Mungia competition, the namesake of the Sukalki Eguna gastronomic festival, has been held since 1964 and is one of the largest; in 2022 it had nearly 200 entries.

== See also ==
- Marmitako, another Basque dish which is often competed over
