= Pedro Subijana =

Spanish chef

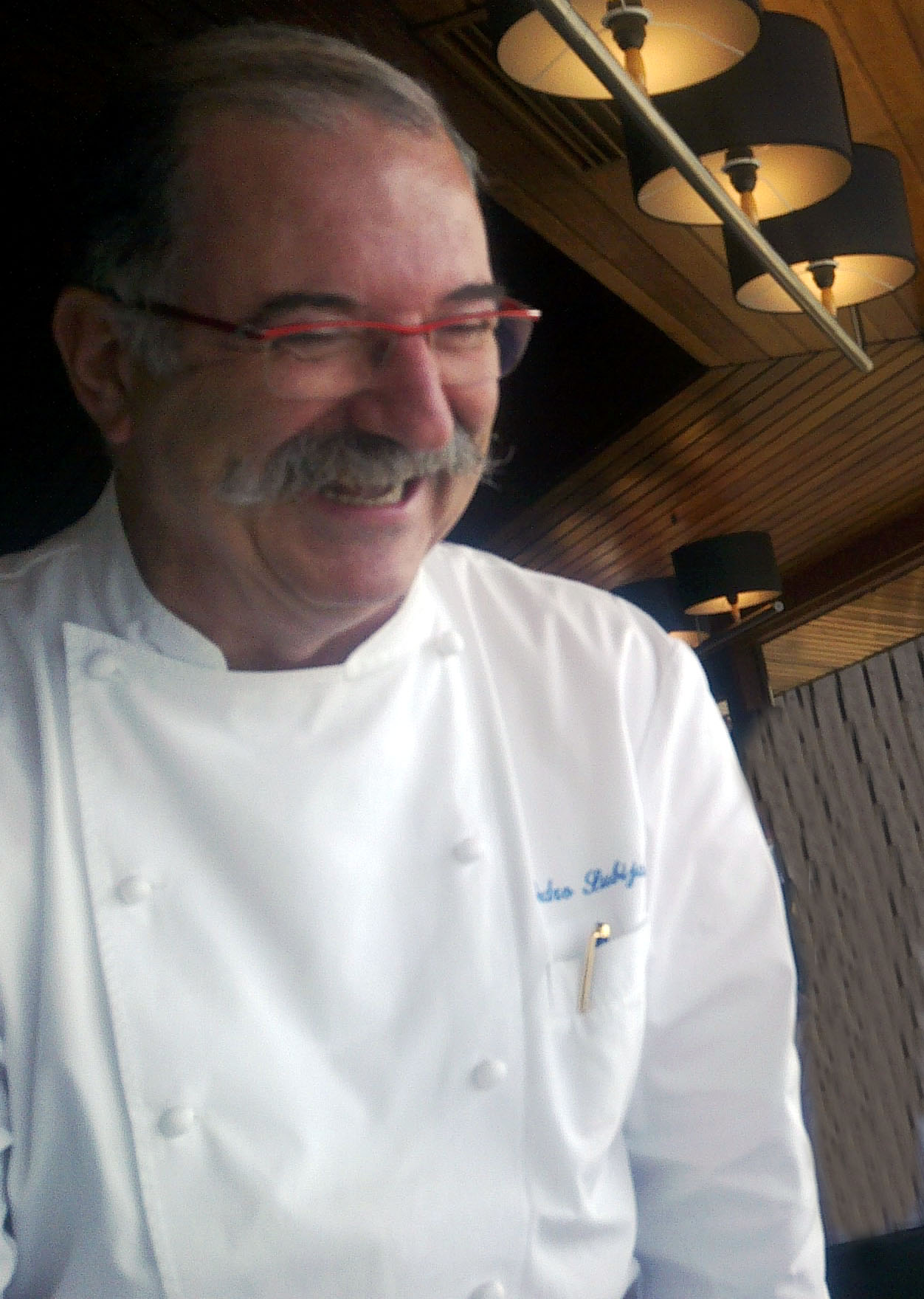
- Born: 5 November 1948 (age 77); San Sebastián, Spain
- Culinary career
- Rating: (Michelin Guide)
- Current restaurant: Akelarre
- Website: akelarre.net

Pedro Subijana Reza (born 5 November 1948) is a Spanish chef who runs the restaurant Akelarre in San Sebastián, Spain. In 2006, his restaurant received its third Michelin star.

== Early life ==
He studied at Madrid's Casa de Campo Hospitality School. He then enrolled in the Luis Irizar Cooking School in Zarautz, where he would later teach. After his first professional experiences in Tolosa, Hernani, Madrid, and Estella, he arrived at restaurante Akelarre to work as a cook.

== Career ==
In 1975, he became the head chef and was recognized in gastronomical guides and joining Relais & Chateaux and Les Grandes Tables du Monde.

He defends the necessity of teaching nutrition at school. As a teacher, he has given lectures in multiple European and American institutions, as well as in Spanish companies and schools.

He has been a promoter of some of the main initiatives of haute cuisine in Spain, including the New Basque Cuisine between 1976 and 1978 and Euro-Toques, which he founded alongside Juan Mari Arzak and other European chefs in 1986. In the same organization, he took the roles of General Commissioner for Spain, International President, and Spanish President, until stepping down at the end of April 2018. Subijana is also a promoter of the Basque Culinary Center in San Sebastián, and an associate teacher at the University of Navarre.

In 1992, he began presenting the television program La cocina de Pedro Subijana (Pedro Subijana's Kitchen) on Euskal Telebista, which aired more than 1,400 episodes.

== Recognition ==
- 1978 Receives first Michelin Star.
- 1979 Premio Nacional de Gastronomía al Mejor Cocinero.
- 1982 Premio Club Gourmets al Mejor Cocinero de España.
- 1982 Receives second Michelin Star.
- 1997 El Grupo Gourmets le concede de nuevo, el Premio al Cocinero del año.
- 1999 Mejor Cocinero en "Lo Mejor de la Gastronomía".
- 2000 Premio Alimentos de España 2001.
- 2002 Gourmetour (9,5 points).
- 2002 4 soles in Guía Campsa.
- 2003 Es nombrado Presidente de Eurotoques Internacional.
- 2006 Receives third Michelin Star.
- 2011 Es reconocido por la Federación Española de Hostelería en los Premios Nacionales de Hostelería.
- 2015 Recibe el tambor de oro de San Sebastián.
- 2016 Galardonado con el Premio Nacional de Gastronomía Lola Torres en O Grove.
- 2016 Gold Medal of Merit in the Fine Arts (Ministerio de Cultura y Deportes).
- 2016 Medalla al Mérito de las Bellas Artes.
- 2017 Premios Pilpil.
- 2017 Premio Lo Mejor de la gastronomía.

Subijana is a member of Relais Châteaux.[22]

== Writing ==
- Menú del día I (1992).
- Menú del día II (1993).
- Denok sukaldari (1994).
- Cocina riojana (coautor junto con Lorenzo Cañas).
- Mis recetas de la tele (1995).
- Pedro Subijana cocinando para Inasmet (1998).
- La cocina vasca de Pedro Subijana (1999).
- La cocina vasca para el Grupo Ingeteam (1999).
- La cocina de Akelarre, el sueño de Pedro Subijana (Everest, 2001).
- La cocina doméstica de Pedro Subijana (Astamenda-Ttarttalo, 2003).
- Akelarre (Everest, 2011).
- BASQUE Territorio Creativo (Spainmedia Books 2016).
