= Basque cider =

Beverage from Spain

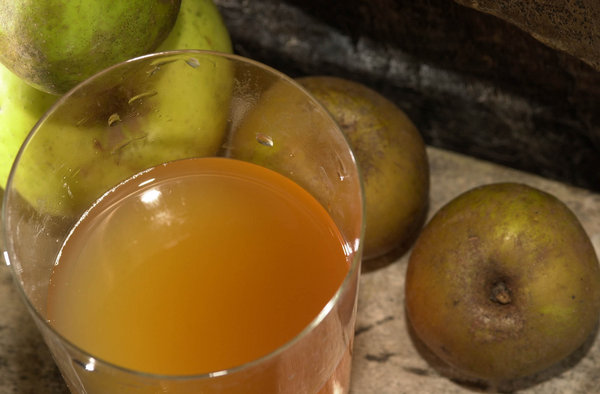

Basque cider is an apple cider from the Basque region of Europe served at sagardotegi (cider houses). Known as Sagardoa, the cider in Basque cuisine is produced at cider houses in areas such as Astigarraga, Spain, an apple growing region. It is sold in bottles, is still (non-carbonated), and poured from height. Salted cod omelette is a traditional dish eaten in Basque cider houses. Quince jelly and nuts are also served as well as steak.

The production of the Basque cider is similar to winemaking in many ways. Apple harvesting starts in September and October to prepare raw material for barrel fermentation. The cider is then fermented up to the middle of spring. Compared to natural winemaking, Basque cider manufacturers do not add any commercial yeast. Spontaneous fermentation is the preferred way to produce cider in the Basque region. There's also a Basque tradition called "txotx" when barkeeps pour the cider right from the barrel directly into a glass 3 to 6 feet away to add natural carbonation.

== Protected Designation of Origin ==
In 2016, the "Euskal Sagardoa / Sidra Natural del País Vasco" Protected Designation of Origin (PDO) was established, following a process led jointly by the Basque cider sector, the three provincial governments (Diputaciones) of Álava, Biscay and Gipuzkoa, and the Basque Government. The PDO requires cider to be produced exclusively from native Basque apple varieties, with quality control from the orchard to bottling, including organoleptic analysis carried out at the Fraisoro laboratories.

As of 2019, the PDO comprised 48 cider-producing wineries (41 in Gipuzkoa, 5 in Biscay and 2 in Álava), yielding 3.5 million litres of PDO-certified cider out of an estimated total Basque production of around 12 million litres that year.

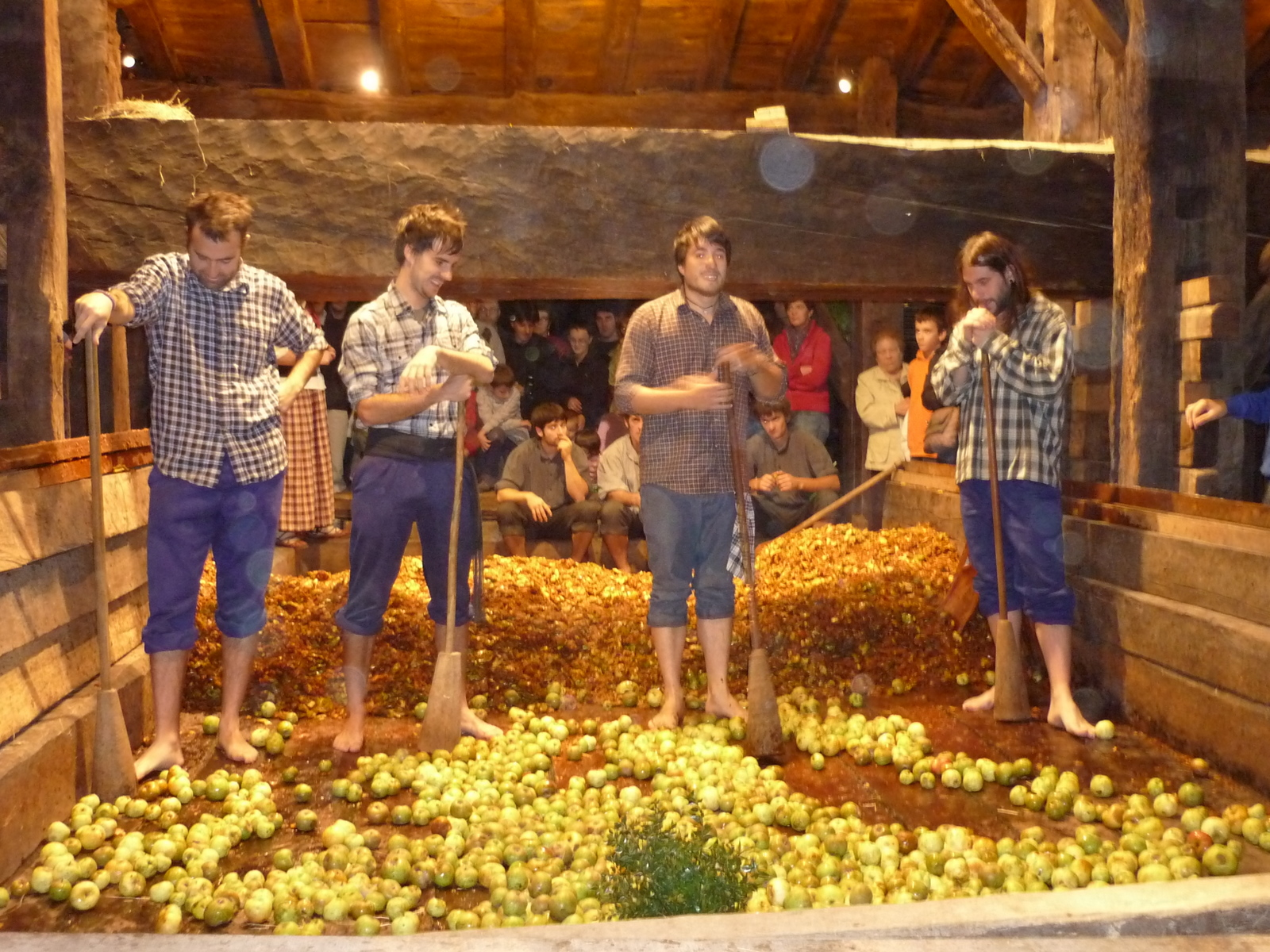

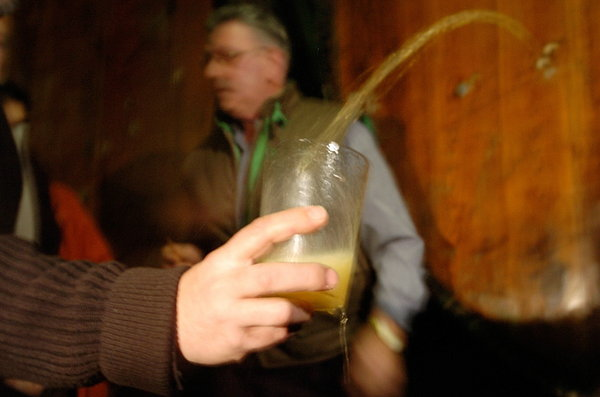

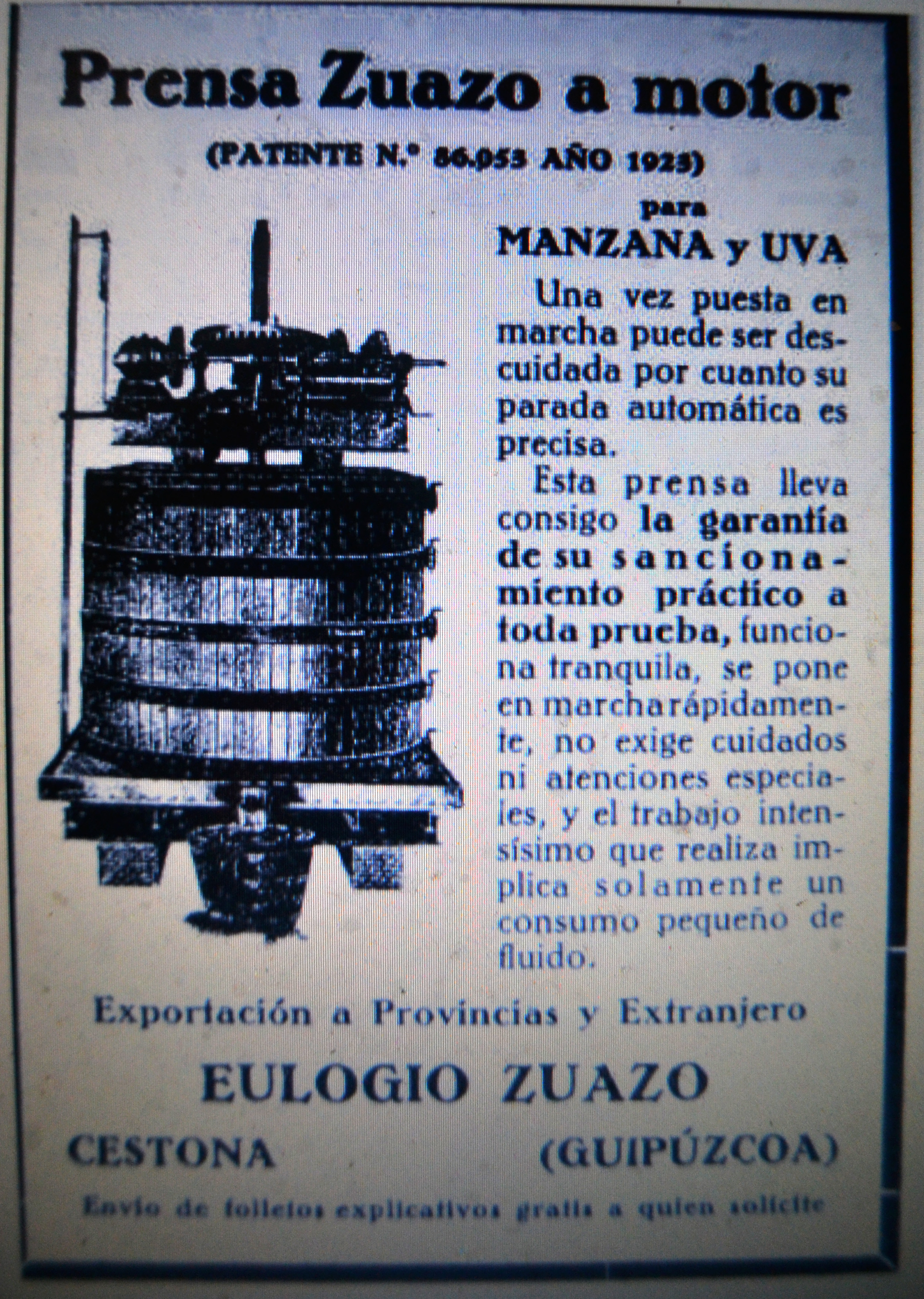

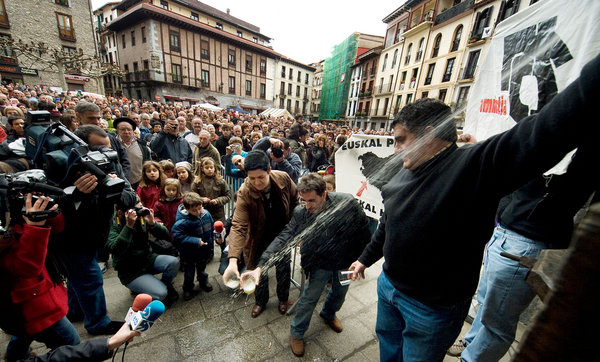

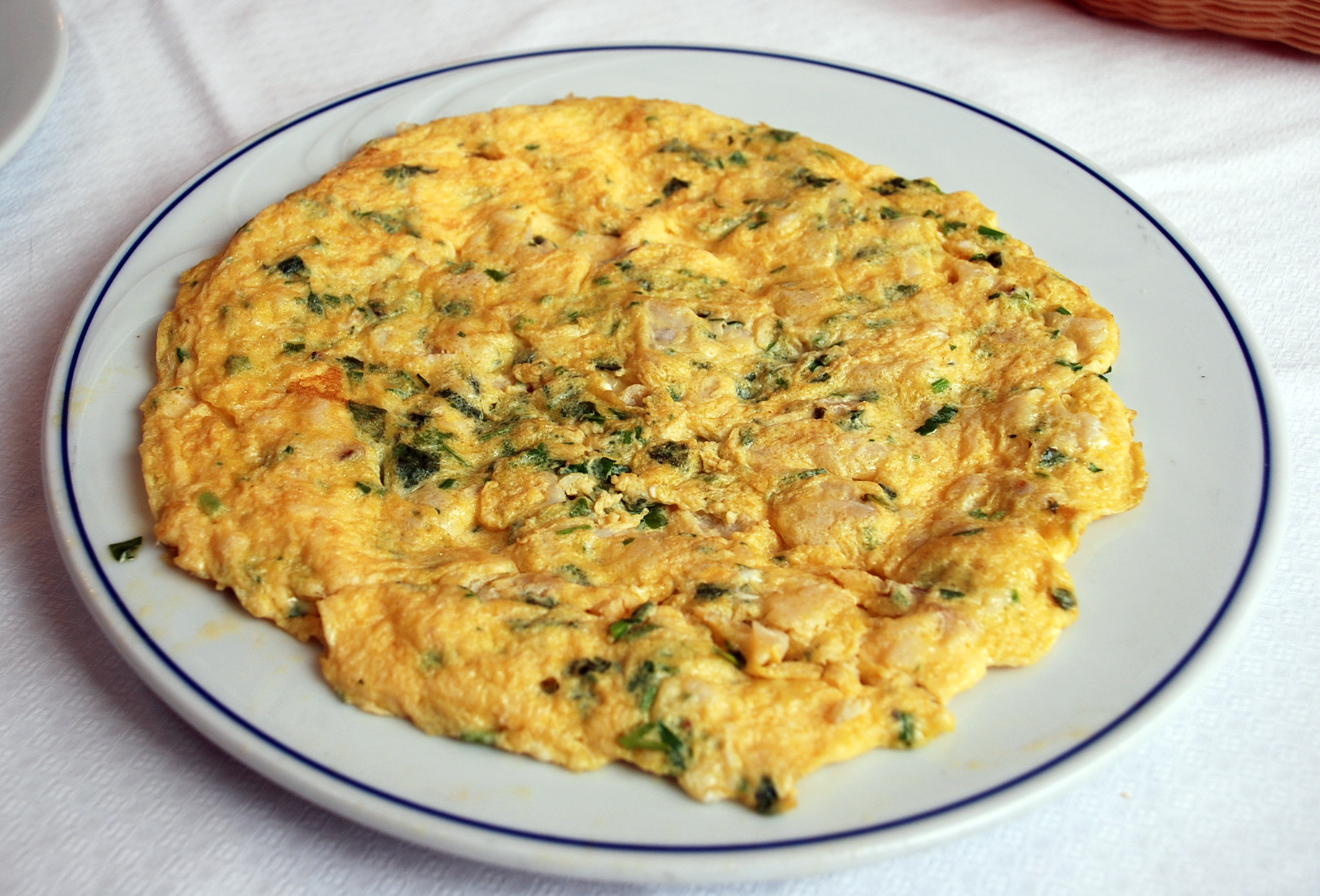
A cod omelette
