= Basque cuisine =

Local cuisine of the Basque region

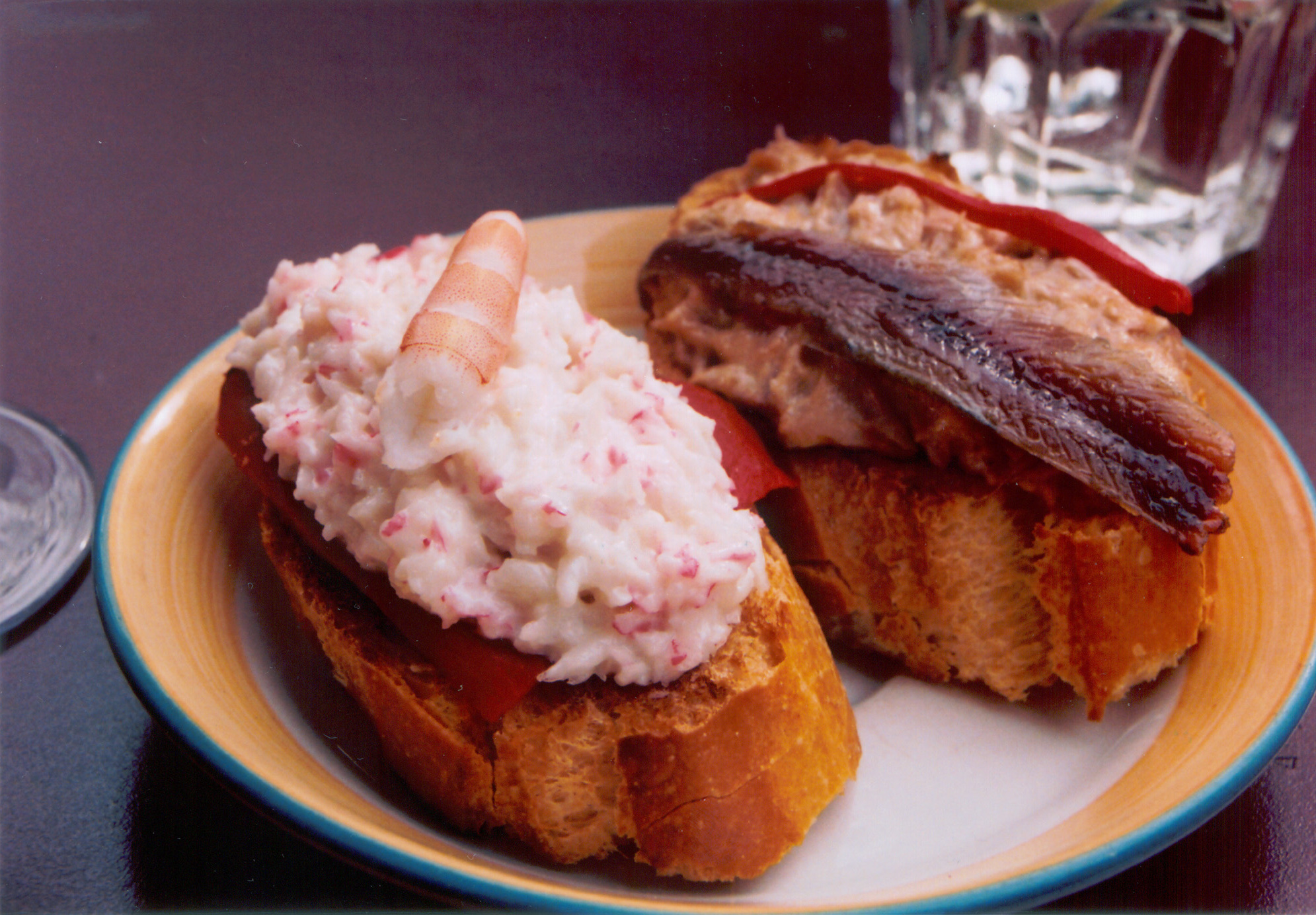

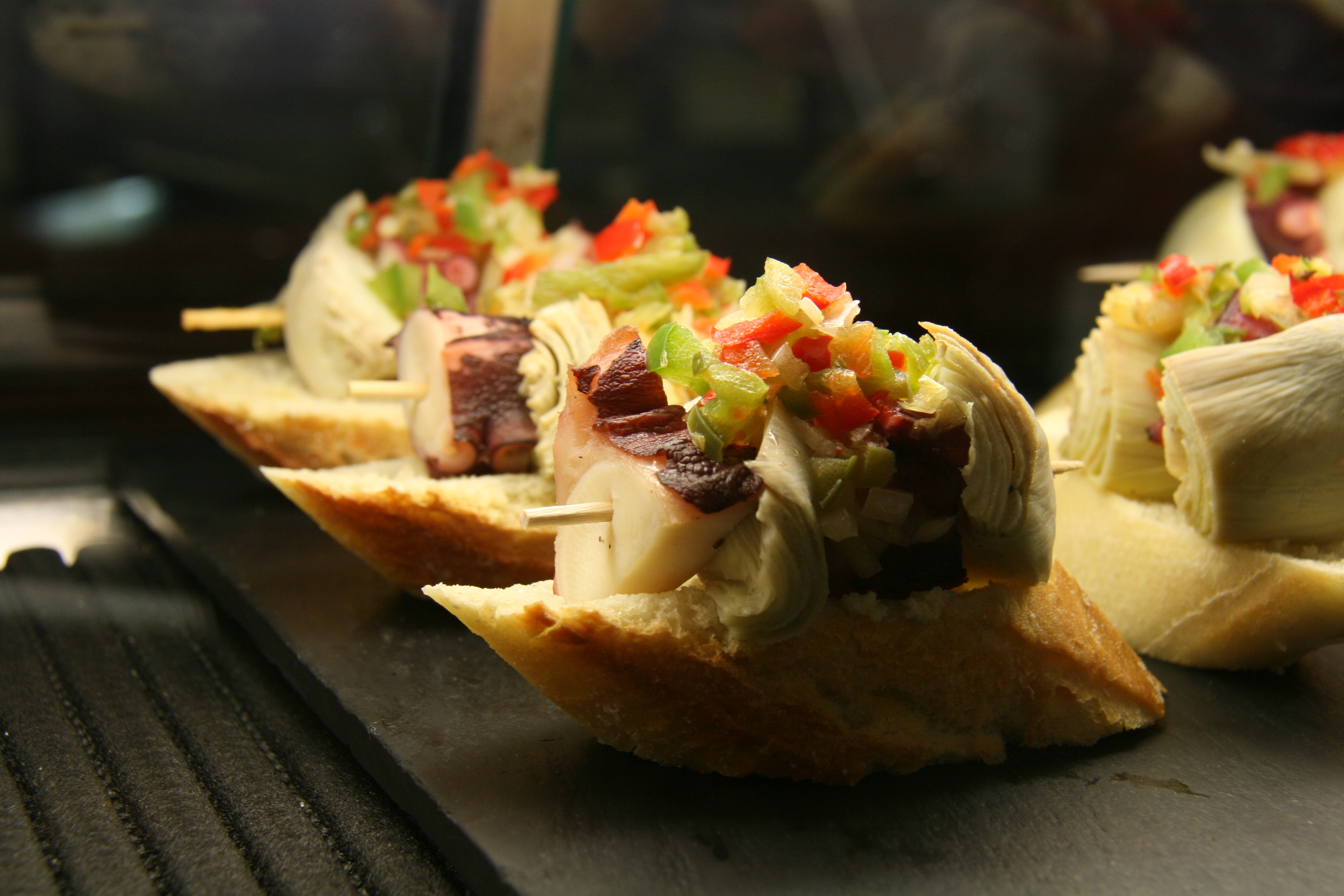
The traditional pintxos

Basque cuisine refers to the cuisine of the Basque Country and includes meats and fish grilled over hot coals, marmitako and lamb stews, cod, Tolosa bean dishes, paprikas from Lekeitio, pintxos (Basque tapas), Idiazabal sheep's cheese, txakoli (sparkling white wine), and Basque cider.

A basquaise is a type of dish prepared in the style of Basque cuisine that often includes tomatoes and sweet or hot red peppers.

== Overview ==
Basques have also been quick to absorb new ingredients and techniques from new settlers and from their own trade and exploration links. Jews expelled from Spain and Portugal created a chocolate and confectionery industry in Bayonne still well-known today, and part of a wider confectionery and pastry tradition across the Basque Country. Basques embraced the potato and the capsicum, used in hams, sausages and recipes, with pepper festivals around the area, notably Ezpeleta and Puente la Reina.

Olive oil is more commonly used than other vegetable oils in Basque cooking.

One of the staple cookbooks for traditional Basque dishes was initially published in 1933. "La cocina de Nicolasa" (the Kitchen of Nicolasa) by Nicolasa Pradera has gone into 20 editions.

=== Ways of eating ===
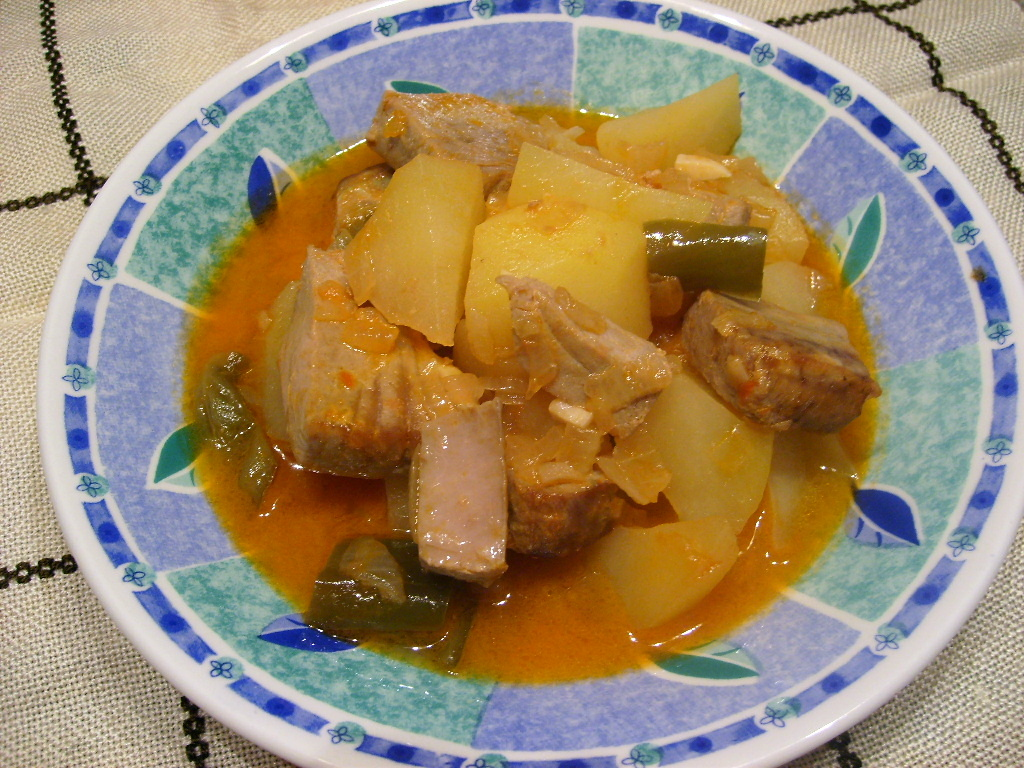
A dish of marmitako in bonito variety

In addition to the dishes and products of the Basque Country, there are features of the way of preparing and sharing food unique to the area.

Cider houses (sagardotegiak) are a feature of the hills around Donostia, especially near Astigarraga. These are usually large country restaurants with enormous barrels of cider. Cider is poured from a height straight into the glass for visitors, with a rustic menu invariably of salt cod omelette, grilled T-bone steak and ewes' milk cheese with walnuts and quince paste. The cider houses are only open for a few months of the year.

The txikiteo is the tapas crawl from bar to bar seen across Spain, but it reaches its pinnacle in Donostia, with hundreds of people on the streets of the old town wandering from bar to bar, each known for its specialty, whether it be croquettes, tortilla, toast, or seafood. The txikiteo is also popular in cities such as Pamplona and Bilbao.

Many bars will offer a combination of pre-made pintxos (such as gildas) that are typically cold as well as hot specialities that are made to order. Typically pintxos cost between one and three euros each.

Gerezi beltza arno gorriakin is a cherry soup served warm or cold. The cherries are poached in wine, often with enough sugar added to make a light syrup. A cherry without pits is preferred for this dish. To release their flavor, the cherries are carefully pitted or cut in half. Usually the soup is prepared on the day it will be served, because 24 hours is enough time for the cherries to blanch noticeably in the liquid. The soup is often served with a dollop of sour cream, crème fraîche, or ice cream.

Gastronomic societies, or txoko in Basque, are communal organisations, almost always composed of all men who cook and eat together.

=== New Basque Cuisine ===
In the 1970s and 1980s Basque chefs were influenced by the nouvelle cuisine of France and created the nouvelle cuisine basque, radically original in its form but solidly Basque in substance, with lighter and less rustic versions of traditional dishes and flavours. The first Spanish restaurant to be awarded 3 stars in the Michelin Guide was, in fact, Zalacaín, a Basque restaurant, although located in Madrid. Juan Mari Arzak in Donostia became the most famous exponent and one of the first three-star Michelin Guide restaurants in Spain. In a few years the movement swept across Spain, becoming the state's default haute cuisine. Many tapas bars, especially in San Sebastián, serve modern-style pintxos employing novel techniques and ingredients. In more recent years, young chefs, such as Martin Berasategui, have given new impetus to Basque cuisine.

=== International Basque cuisine ===
Basque cuisine has continued to have an influence on international cuisine, particularly in Spain and France where it is highly regarded. Catalan chef Ferran Adrià has taken the techniques pioneered by Arzak and other Basque chefs to new heights. Karlos Arguiñano has popularised Basque cuisine in Spain through TV and books. Basque cuisine has been enjoyed for decades in Kern County, CA and the area around Elko, NV where a large population of Basque settled. Teresa Barrenechea was among the first people to bring traditional Basque cuisine outside these area's with her first restaurant Marichu in Bronxville in 1991, where she hired Chef Joseba Encabo to set up, develop the menus and run the restaurant till soon later he was offered a position as faculty at the Culinary Institute of America in Hyde Park, New York. Teresa Barrenechea and husband Raynold von Samson continued to promote Basque cuisine in America by opening their second Marichu restaurant in Manhattan in 1994, which was close to the United Nations Headquarters. Teresa Barrenechea has written two books, The Basque Table (Harvard Common Press, Boston 1998) and The Cuisines of Spain (Ten Speed, Berkley 2005). Teresa Barrenechea is the holder of two awards: Premio Nacional de Gastronomía (National Prize of Gastronomy, the highest culinary award given by the Spanish Administration) and Best Regional Cuisine Book at the 5th World Cookbook Fair, Périgueux (France). At the other end of the scale, Basque-style pintxos bars are common in Barcelona and Madrid. In cities where large numbers of Basque people emigrated, such as Buenos Aires, Argentina; São Paulo, Brazil, Boise, Idaho; Fresno, California, and Bakersfield, California, there are several Basque restaurants and a noted Basque influence on the local cuisine.

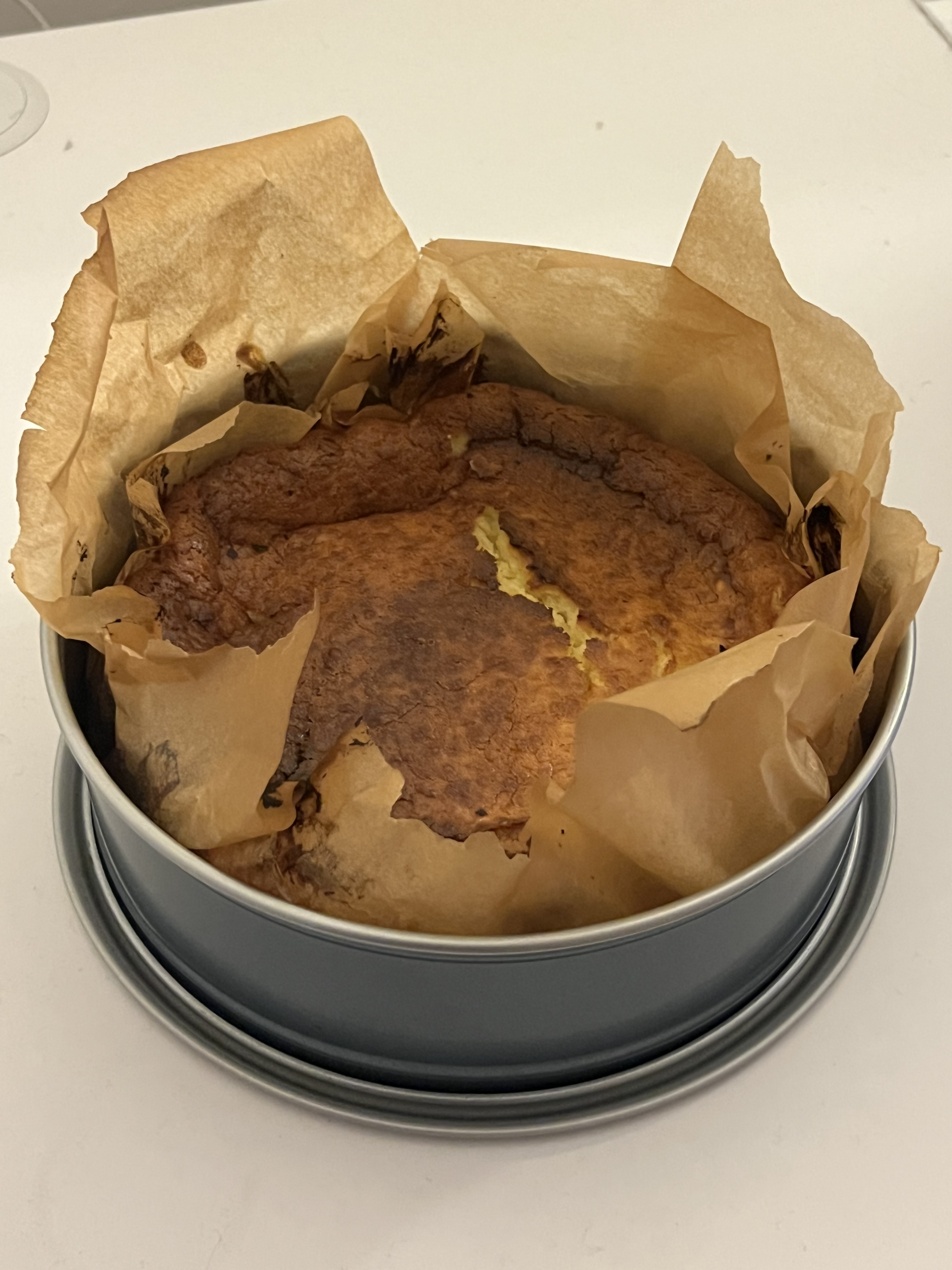
Basque cheesecake

Originating from the La Viña pintxo bar is the now-internationally renowned Basque cheesecake.

== Traditional dishes and desserts ==
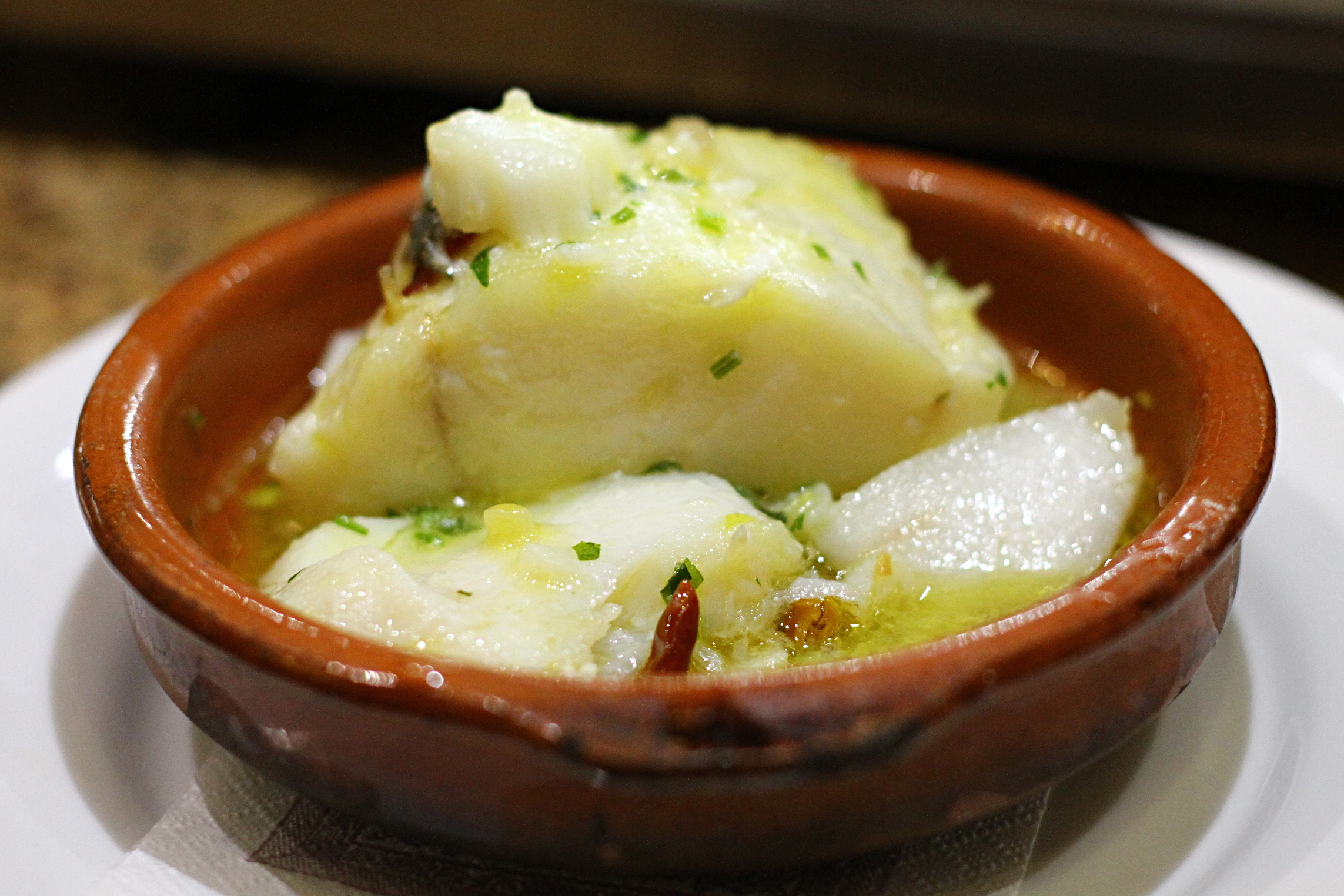
Bacalao al Pil-Pil

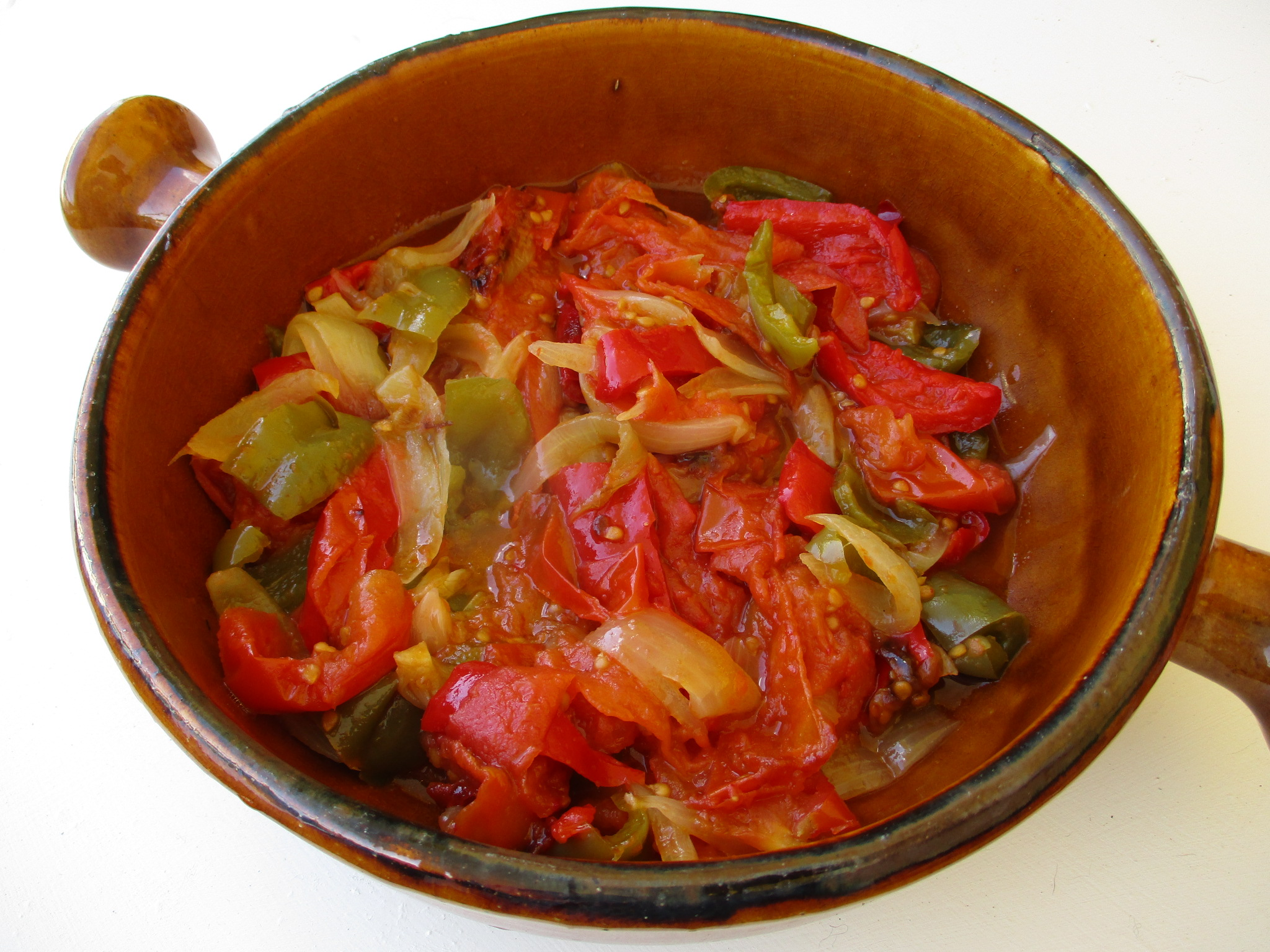
Piperrada

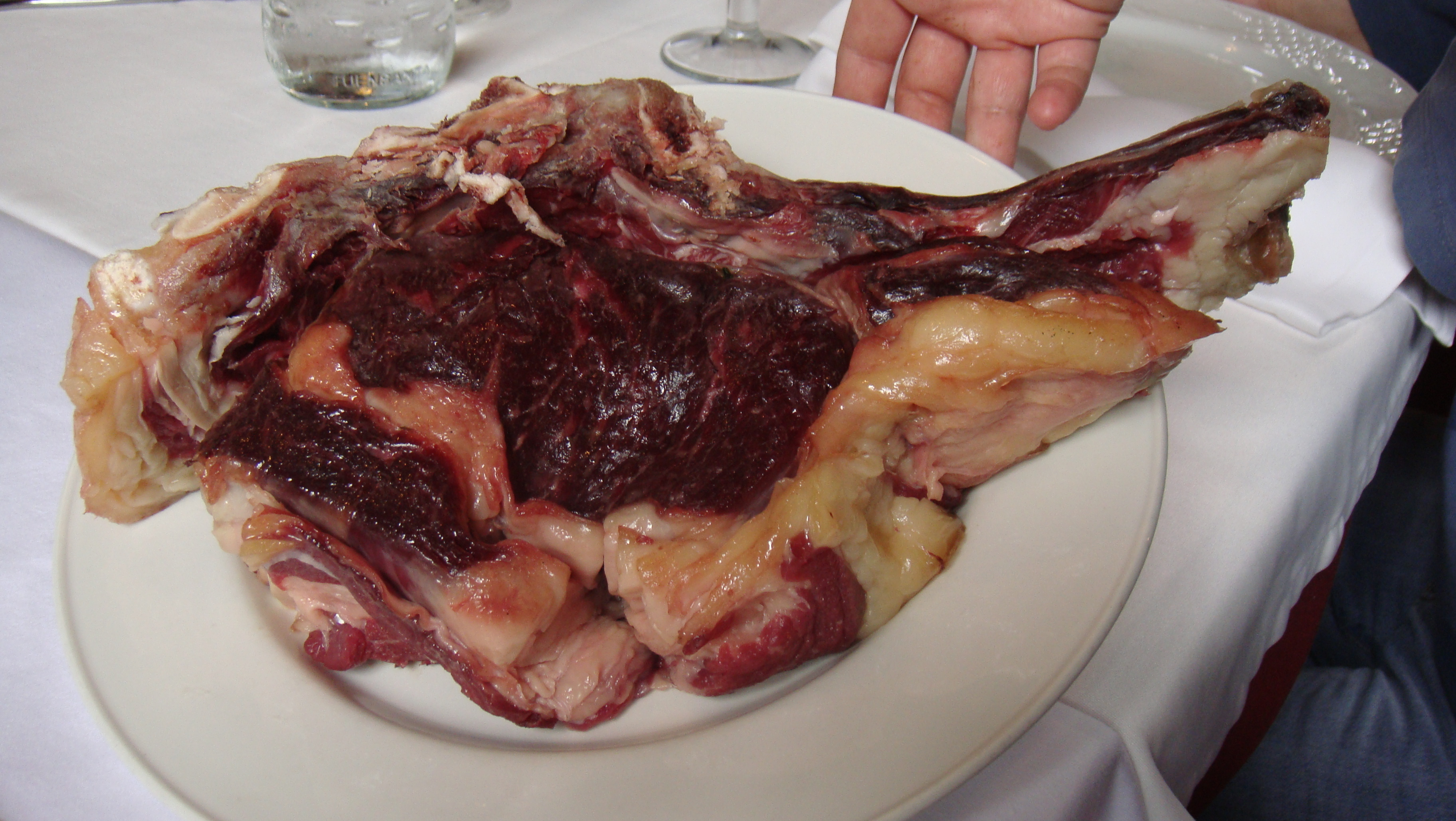
Txuleta

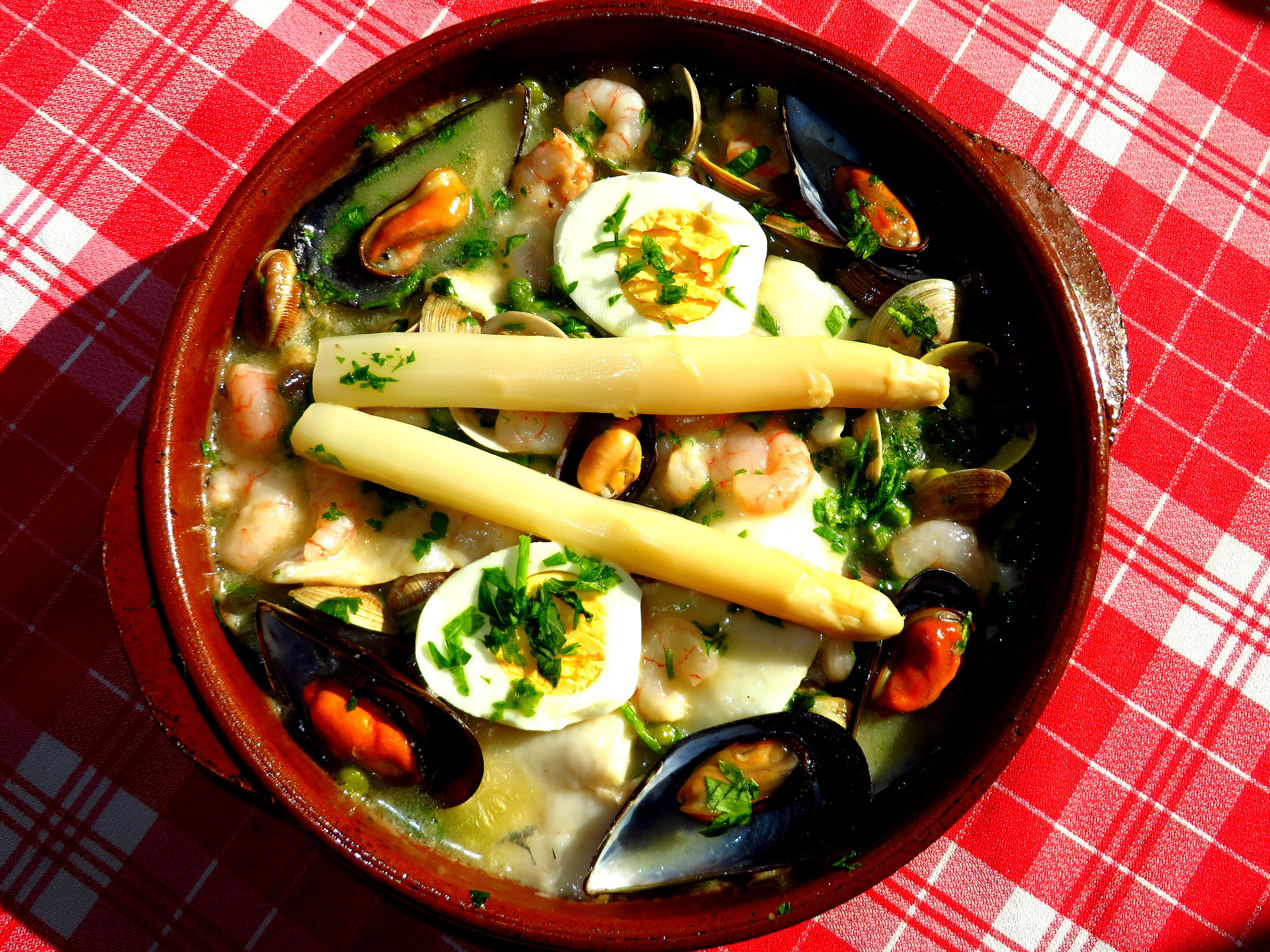
Merlu koxkera

=== Dishes ===
- Bacalao (salted cod) al Pil-Pil or a la Vizcaína
- Elvers (young eel)
- Kokotxas (cheeks of hake)
- Marmitako
- Percebes (Gooseneck barnacles)
- Pintxos (Basque tapas)
- Piperade (or Piperrada)
- Pisto
- Porrusalda (sukaldaritza)
- Talos
- Ttoro
- Txangurro (spider crab)
- Txipirones (baby squid) in their ink
- Txuleta

=== Desserts ===
- Cuajada (Mamia)
- Gâteau Basque (or Biskotx)
- Goxua
- Intxaursaltsa
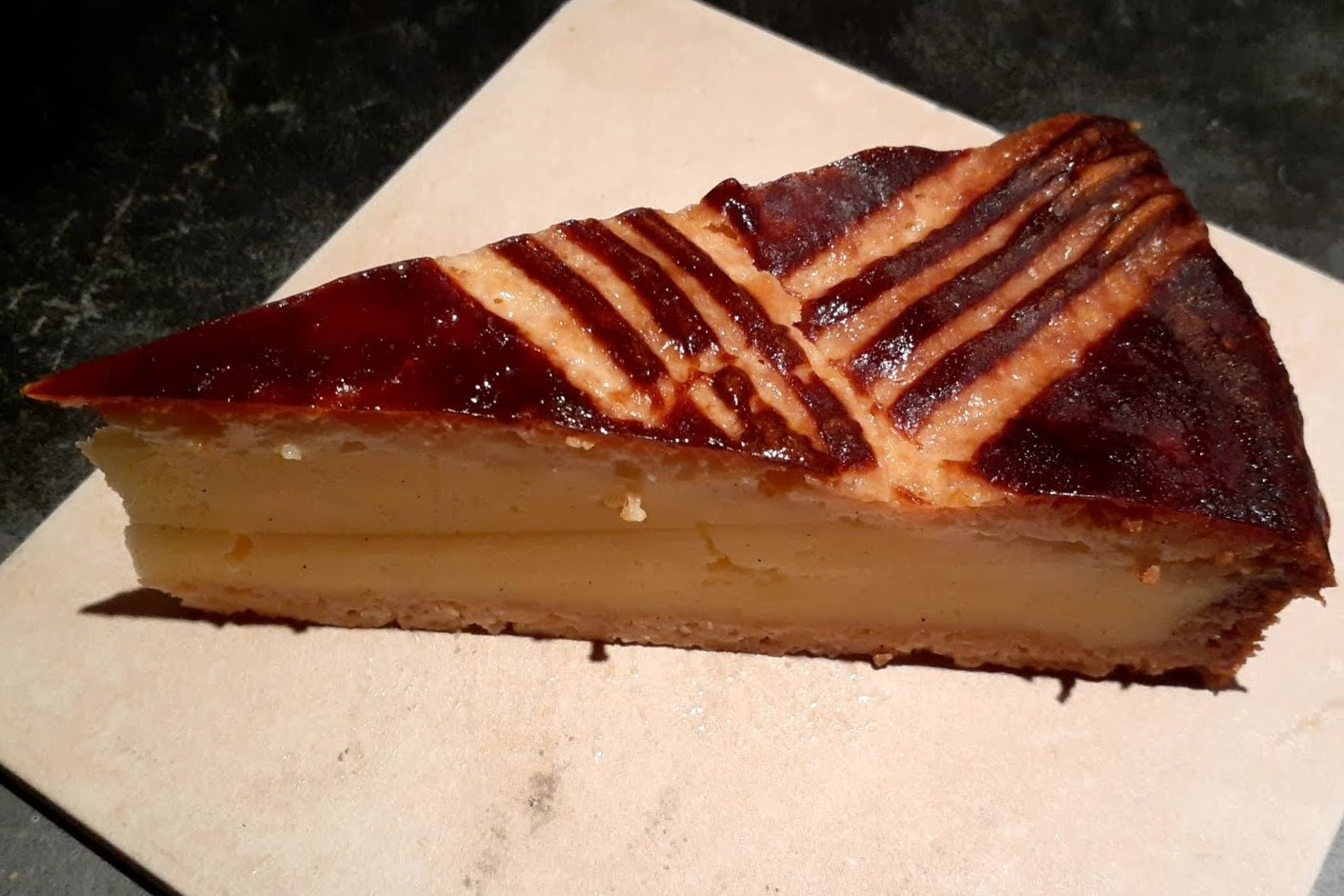
Gâteau basque

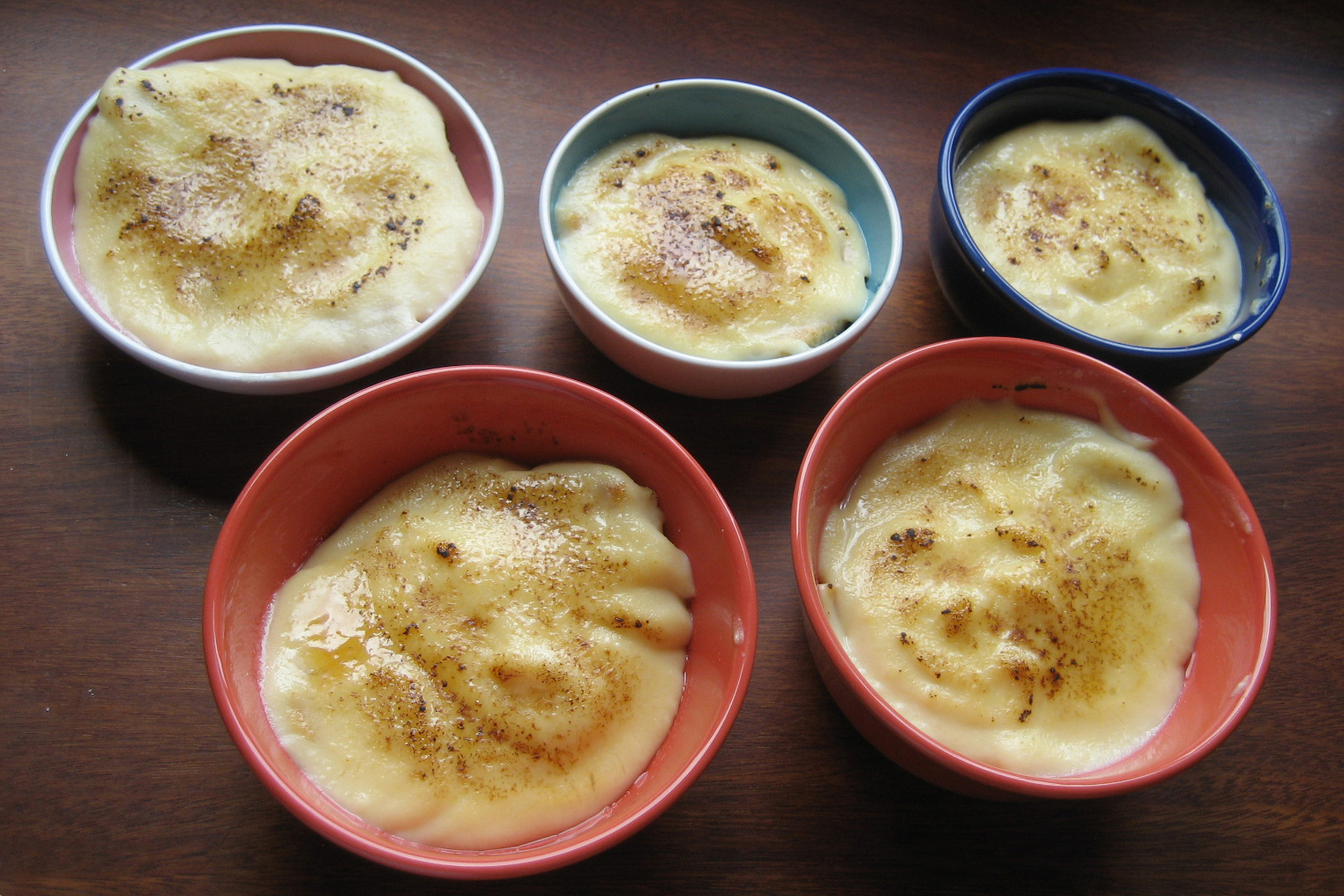
Goxua

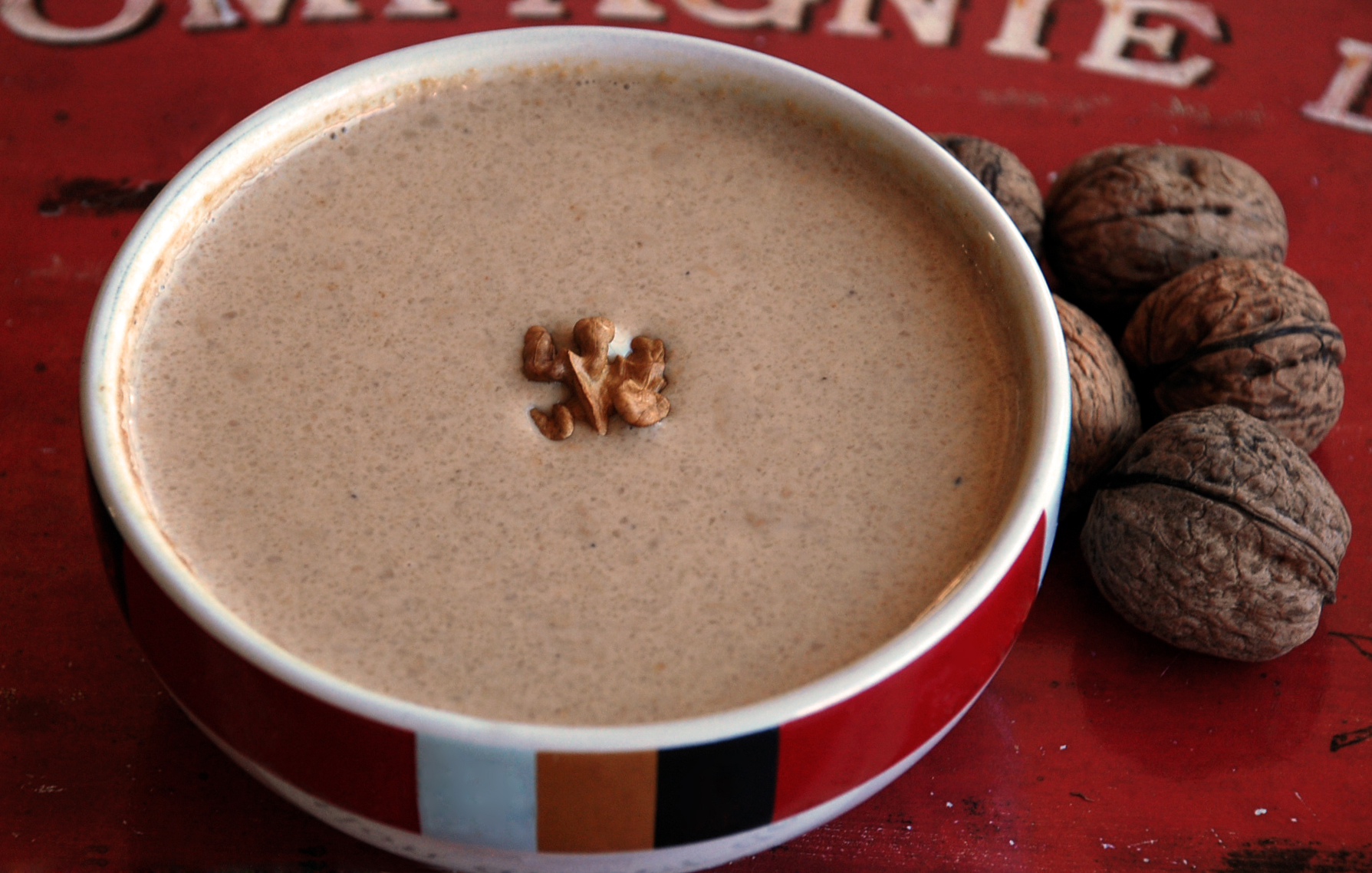
Intxaursaltsa

== Products ==
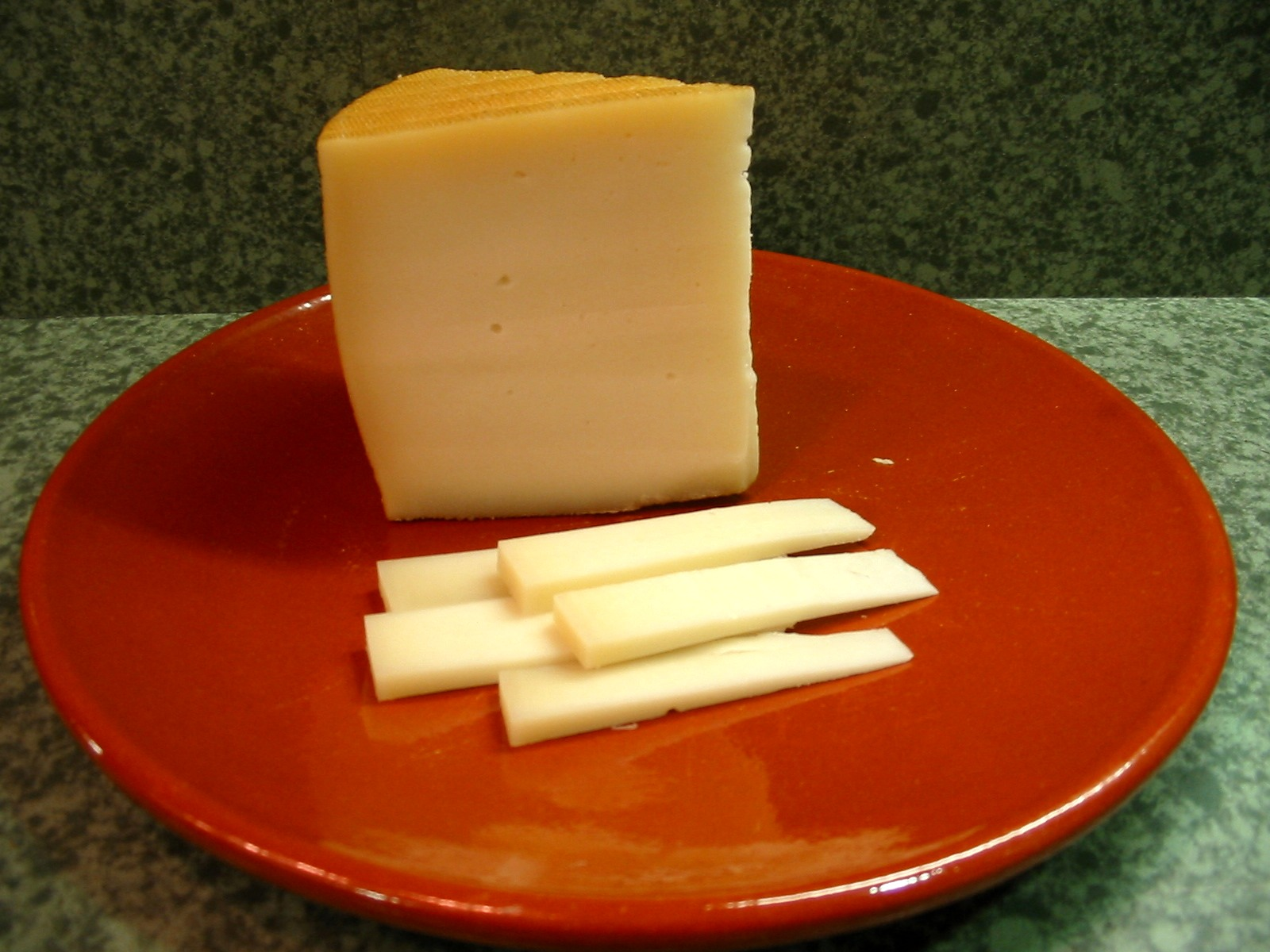
Idiazabal cheese

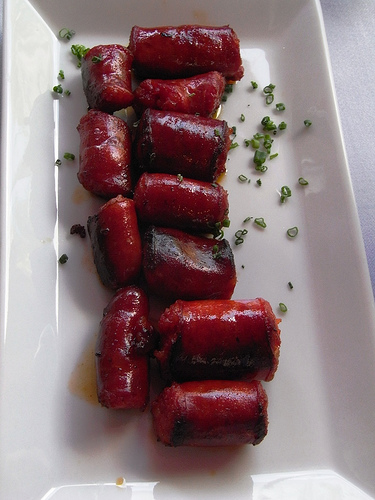
Txistorra

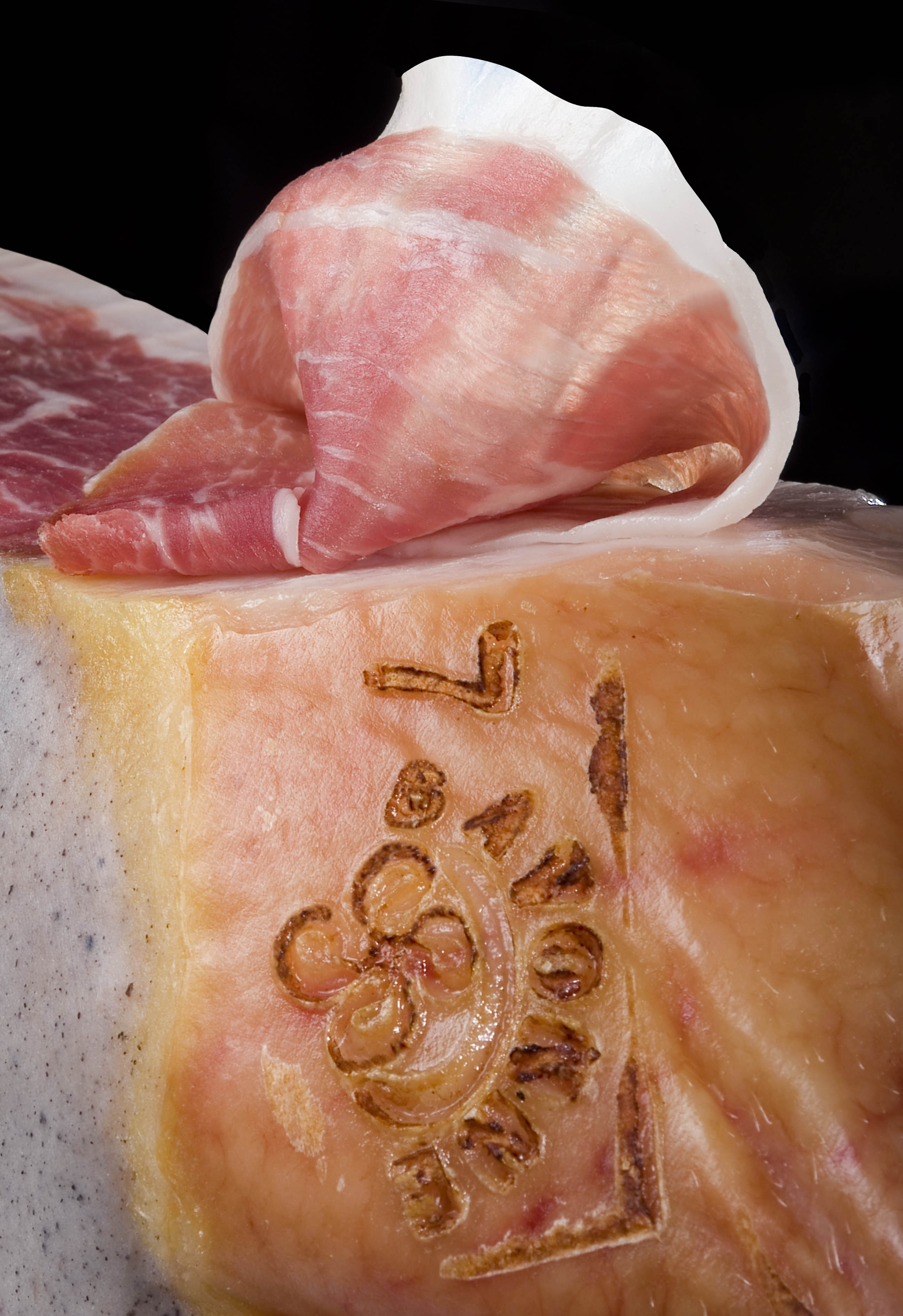
Jambon de Bayonne

=== Cheeses ===
- Roncal
- Ossau-Iraty
- Idiazabal cheese

=== Fruits and vegetables ===
- Artichokes from Tudela
- Asparagus from Mendavia
- Beans from Tolosa
- Peppers from Ezpeleta, Gernika and Lodosa
- Cherries from Itxassou

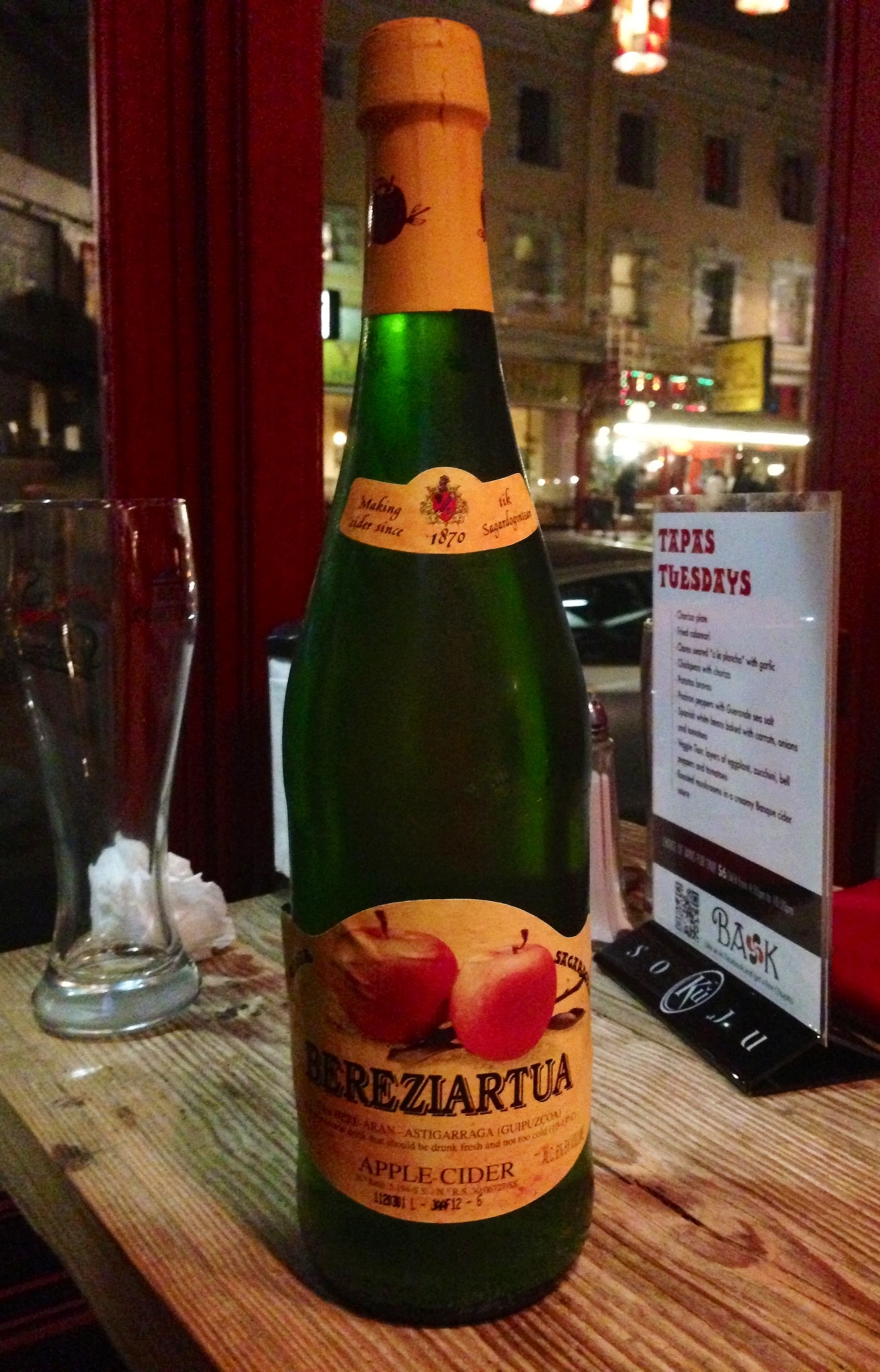
Basque cider

=== Meats ===
- Chistorra and chorizo de Pamplona (spicy sausage)
- Jambon de Bayonne (cured ham)
- Sausages from Viana
- Tripotx (lamb blood-sausage from Biriatou)
- Mondeju, similar to tripotx from Zaldibia
- Lukainka, similar to linguiça

== Beverages ==
- Basque cider served in Basque cider houses (Sagardotegi)
- Irouléguy AOC wine
- Izarra liqueur
- Kalimotxo, a mixture of wine and cola
- Patxaran liqueur
- Pili (mandrake-root liqueur)
- Txakoli wine

== See also ==
- List of Basque restaurants
