= Cherry pitter =

Device for removing the pit from a cherry

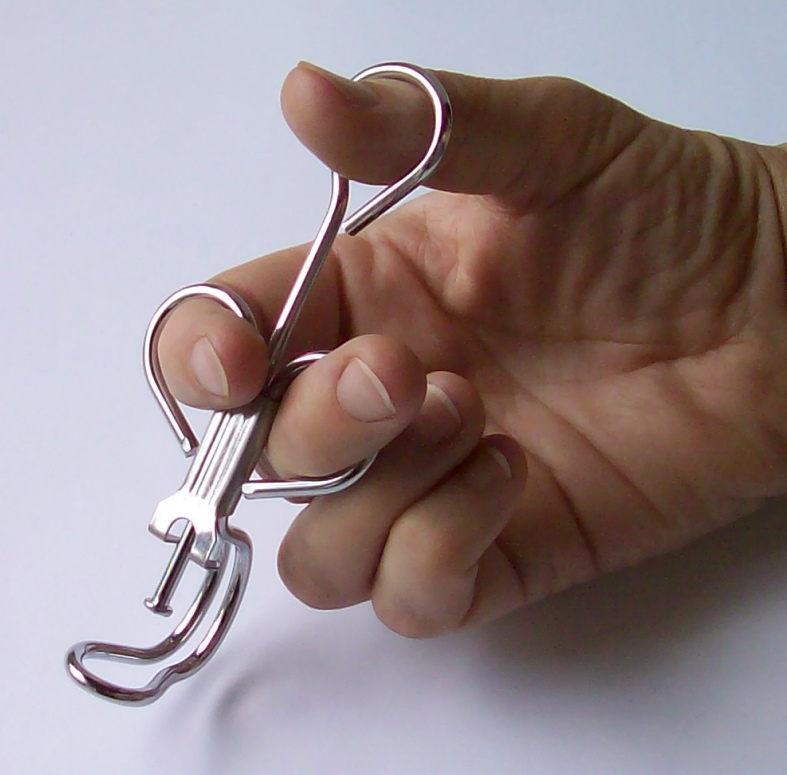
Cherry pitter in hand

A cherry pitter is a device for removing the pit from a cherry, leaving the cherry relatively intact. Many styles of cherry pitters exist, including small tools held in the hand, domestic crank-operated machines with a hopper, and industrial machines.

== Function ==
Use of a hand-held cherry pitter involves first removing the stem, then driving a plunger through the cherry in a way that the stone is ejected out the other side of the fruit, often attached to or held by the plunger. Some of the devices used hollow cylindrical plungers that cut the stone out along with adjacent flesh of the fruit. Other devices use a solid plungers (sometimes with teeth, sometimes just a solid shape) to force the pit to breach the flesh. In almost all cases, the fruit is supported against the plunger by a surface with a hole in the middle, so that the entire fruit does not rupture.

== Development ==
A belt driven Cherry pitter

The range of hand kitchen tools developed for this purpose is vast. Some have platforms to accommodate as many as 7 or more cherries to pit at the same time, employing multiple plungers. The mechanism for the plunger may be fully manual, or it may be retracted by a spring. The path of the plunger may be linear or curved, and the plunger itself may follow the curve of the path of motion.

"DIY" printable cherry pitter designs have been made available online for 3D printing. Some cherry pitters can also be used as olive pitters.

== Gallery ==
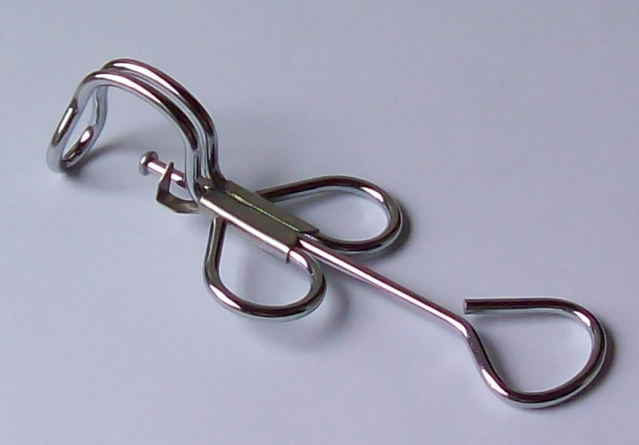
Handheld cherry pitter

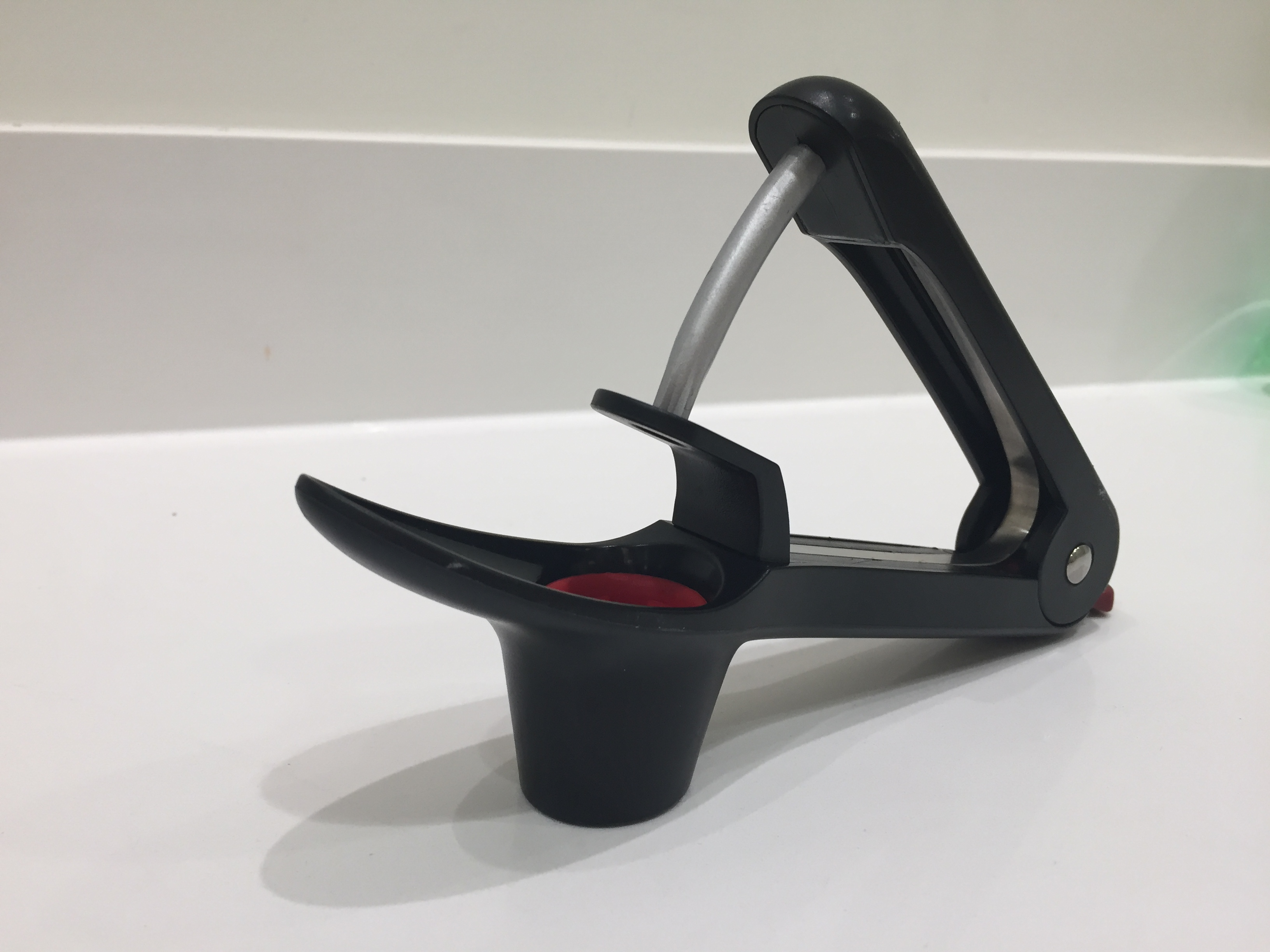
Tabletop cherry and olive pitter

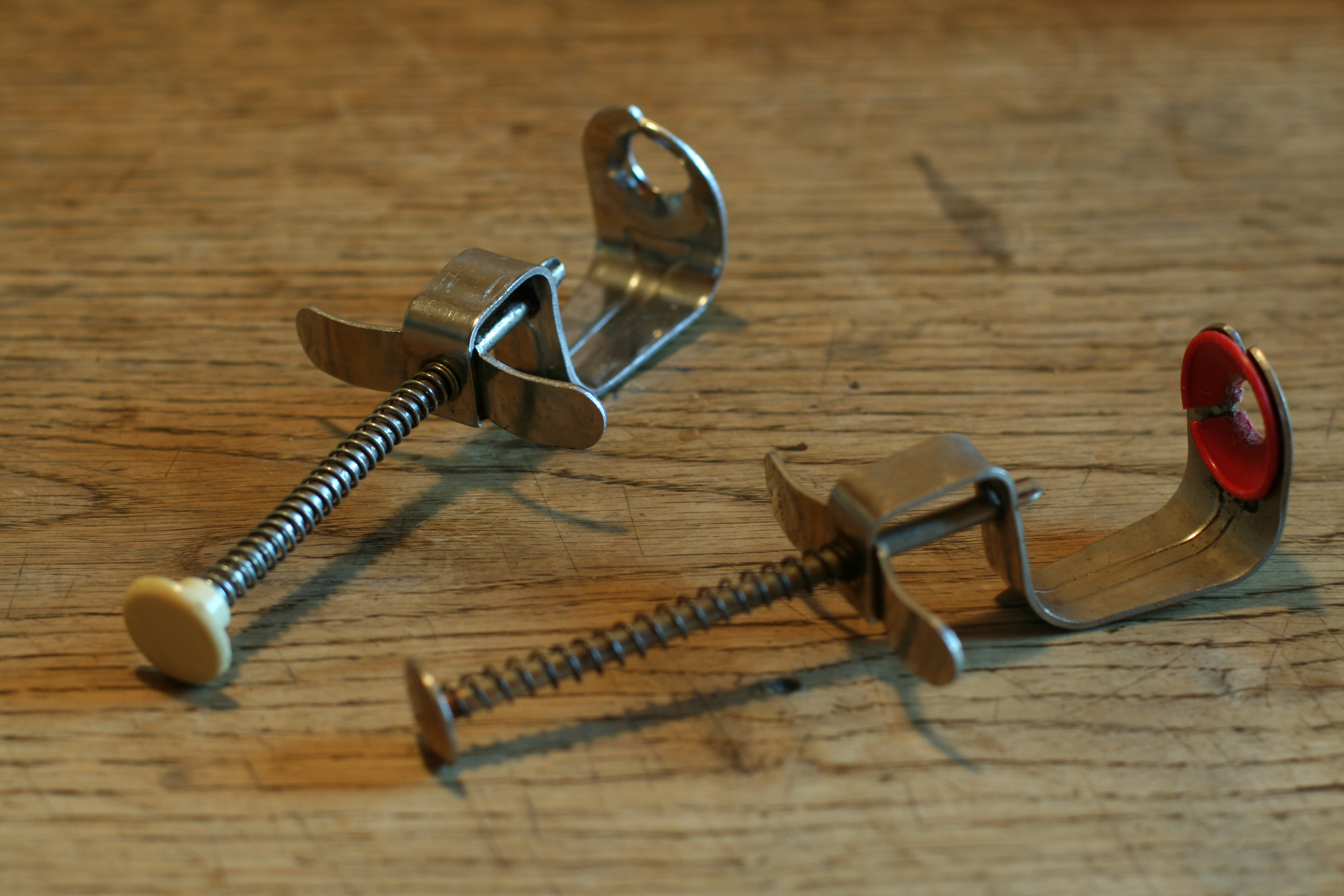
Cherry pitters with spring mechanism

== See also ==
- Kitchen utensil
