= Intxaursaltsa =

Basque dessert

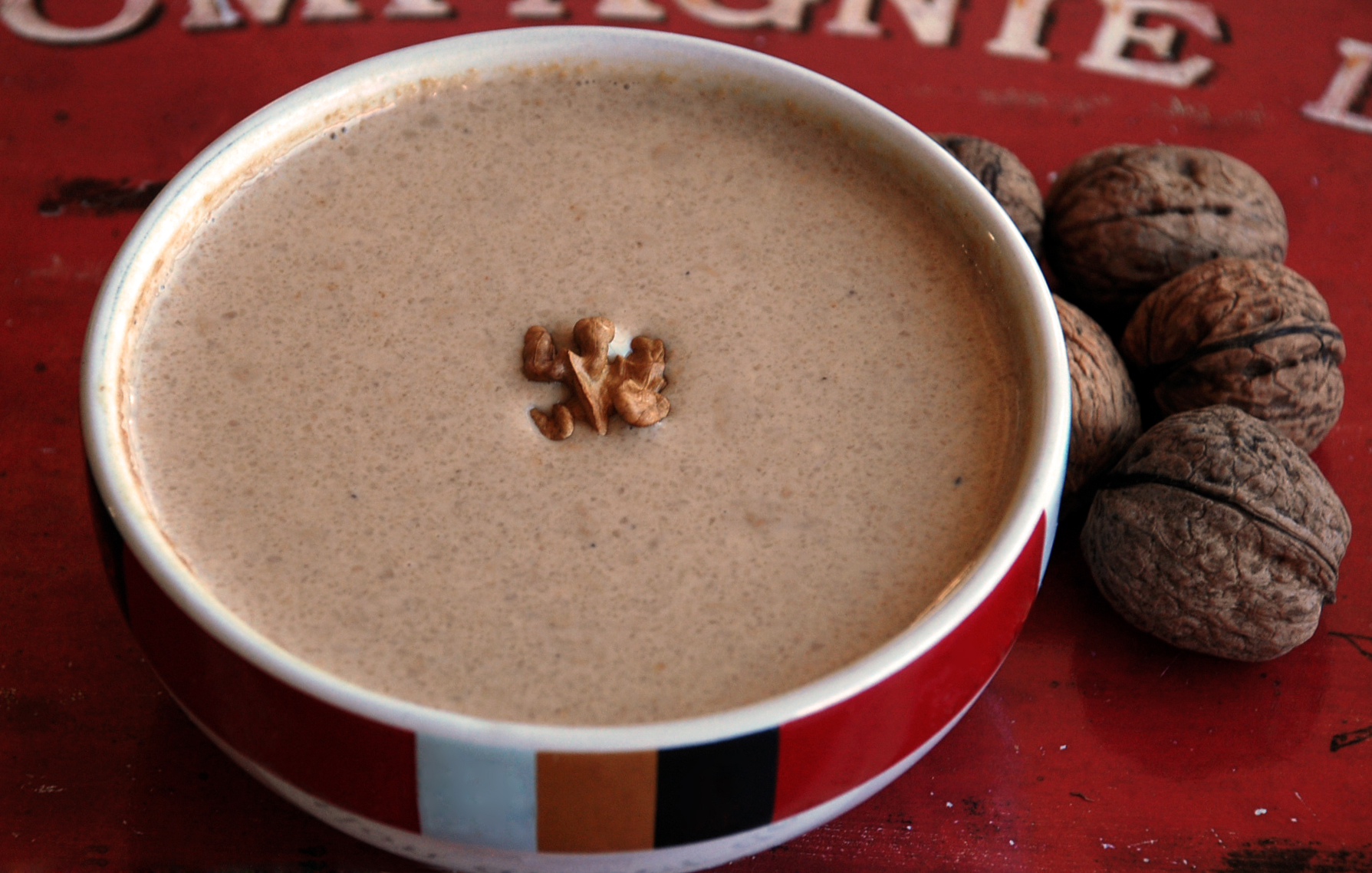
Intxaursaltsa in a typical presentation

Intxaursaltsa (Basque: Nut sauce) is a typical dessert of the Basque Country, where it is traditionally eaten as part of the Christmas Eve feast. Intxaursaltsa is similar in appearance to natilla, and is made from walnuts, milk, sugar and cinnamon.

Intxaursaltsa is known to be high in calories, but the nut oils are thought to be beneficial in fighting coronary diseases.

== History ==
To history of the Intxaursaltsa it goes back more than 150 years. It was a typical dish in the Basque hamlets, especially in the region of Guipuzcoa, for Christmas Eve dinner. It had all but disappeared, likely due to the lengthy preparation time, but has made a recent resurgence.

== Ingredients ==
The principal ingredients which are used to cook this dessert are sugar, nuts, cinnamon and milk.
