= Izarra (liqueur) =

Alcoholic beverage from the Basque Country, Spain

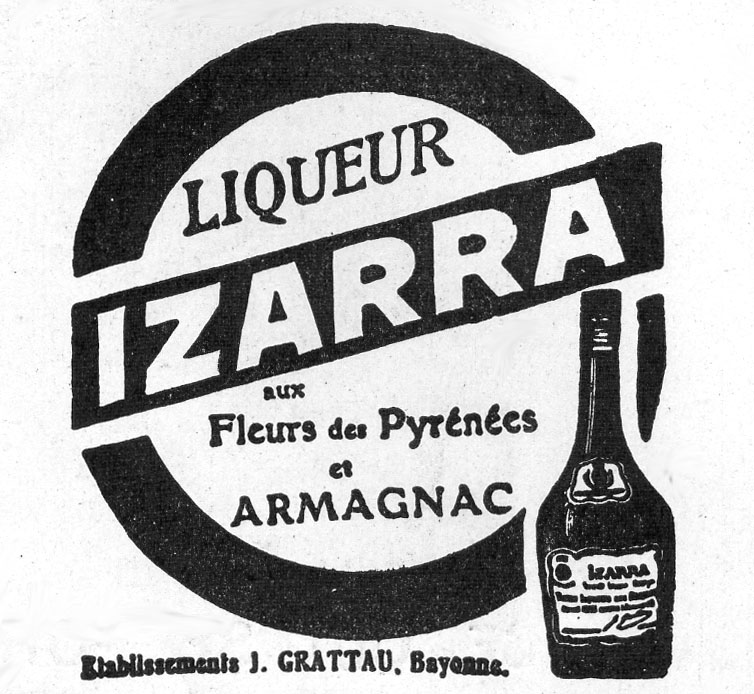
- Type: Liqueur
- Manufacturer: Groupe Vedrenne
- Origin: Northern Basque Country, France
- Introduced: 1904
- Proof (US): 40-48
- Colour: yellow & green
- Variants: Yellow Izarra, Green Izarra
- Website: vedrenne.fr/izarra/

Izarra means “star” in Basque, and is a brand of liqueur that was created in 1906 in Hendaye, in the Basque Country, by the botanist and pharmacist Joseph Grattau.

Izarra is a liqueur made from a distillate of plants, spices and 2 macerations, prunes and walnut husks. After being heated in a copper still, the distillate is blended with armagnac in accordance with the original recipe.

A symbol of the Basque Country, Izarra was acquired by Cointreau SA in 1981 then sold in 2015 to Spirited Brands Limited, and has been distributed by the Vedrenne group since 2018.

== Range ==
Izarra can be enjoyed in cocktails, as a long drink or neat as an after-dinner liqueur.

In the course of its history, it has crossed paths with Ernest Hemingway, Nikita Khrushchev and French chef Pierre Gagnaire.

There are two types of Izarra :

- Green Izarra (Izarra Berdea in Basque, Izarra Vert in French) 48% abv, made with 17 plants, including nutmeg, coriander seeds and leaves, fennel, angelica seeds and root, celery, balsam, elderflower, black caraway (nigella), wild thyme, cardamom, green aniseed, wormwood, lemon balm, peppermint, cinnamon, green walnut and prunes.
- Yellow Izarra (Izarra Horia in Basque, Izarra Jaune in French) also 40% abv, whose final blend includes honey which is added after various macerations in alcohol and armagnac.

== Production ==
The liqueur was inspired by a formula dating from 1835 that Joseph Grattau discovered when he set up his business in Bayonne.

To recreate the original flavour, the recipe was revised in 2019, with a greater concentration of plants and a reduced sugar content.

Green and yellow Izarra have a common base of ten plants and spices that are first distilled in a copper still. A simple spirit is produced, of which only the heart or “middle cut” is retained. This is then blended with a mixture of walnut husks and prunes which has itself been macerated several months in pure spirit.

Finally, for green Izarra, the master distiller adds some armagnac and a little sugar to obtain Izarra, known in its glory years as “sunshine in a glass”.

For yellow Izzara, the final blend includes honey which is added after various macerations in alcohol and armagnac.

== History ==
- The botanist Joseph Grattau created the “Izarra Fine-Hendaye” liqueur in Hendaye in the Basque Country in 1906.
- In 1907, the pelota champion Chiquito gave a bottle of Izarra to King Edward VII of England when he was visiting Sare.
- In 1909, Izarra covered the walls of houses in the Basque Country with advertisements and commissioned numerous posters that appeared in Biarritz and Bayonne.
- In 1912, building on its success, Izarra expanded and opened a large distillery in Bayonne on the banks of the Adour.
- In 1926, Izarra featured in Ernest Hemingway’s first novel, The Sun Also Rises.
- In 1929, Izarra gained further acclaim in a new cocktail called, Et moi je te dis…Maud (“That’s Maud for you”), that won the Championnat de Cocktail des Artistes in Paris.
- In 1934, to accompany Izarra’s arrival in the US, Zulla released its famous Izarra poster.
- In the 1950s, as the Basque Country's iconic liqueur, Izarra sponsored numerous events, from ski competitions in the Pyrenees to pelota championships and traditional festivals.
- In 1950, the poster designer Paul Colin produced Izarra’s most famous advertisement, which was seen all over the world.
- In 1955, Izarra acquired its rival “La Liqueur d’Hendaye”.
- In March 1960, the USSR minister, Nikita Khrushchev, tasted Izarra in Pau at a dinner held in his honour during the Cold War.
- Izarra prospered during the 1960s, opening production facilities in Mexico, Argentina, Columbia, Venezuela, and Spain, with more than 1,200,000 bottles sold.
- In 1981, Cointreau bought Izarra from the Grattau family.
- In 1998, the historic distillery in Bayonne was destroyed and the liqueur was produced at Cointreau’s main factory in Angers.
- In 2011, the Rémy Cointreau group relaunched the brand. Izarra’s head office was re-established in Bayonne.
- In 2015, Spirited Brands, founded and directed by Roland Giscard d'Estaing, acquired the brand.
- In 2018, Vedrenne took over distribution of the Izarra brand.

== Cocktails ==
Six top French mixologists have created Izarra-based cocktails of which the most well known are:

- The Basque Mojito, a twist on the classic Mojito with green Izarra instead of rum, for a fresher flavour;
- The Lemon Izarra, green Izarra mixed with Lemon Schweppes or Kas Citron on the rocks. Very fresh and summery, slightly fruity, sweet, pastel green;
- The Emerald Coast, with gin and armagnac.

Several new cocktails have been developed since 2018:

- Tik'Izarra, with green Izarra, orgeat syrup, pineapple juice and lemon juice.
- Basquiano, with yellow Izarra, red Vermouth, Salers 16% and sparkling water.
- Iza Gorria, with yellow Izarra, VEDRENNE Supercassis 20% and tonic water.
- Beko, with green Izarra, Gascogne rosé and tonic water.
