= Tuna pot =

Fish and potato stew

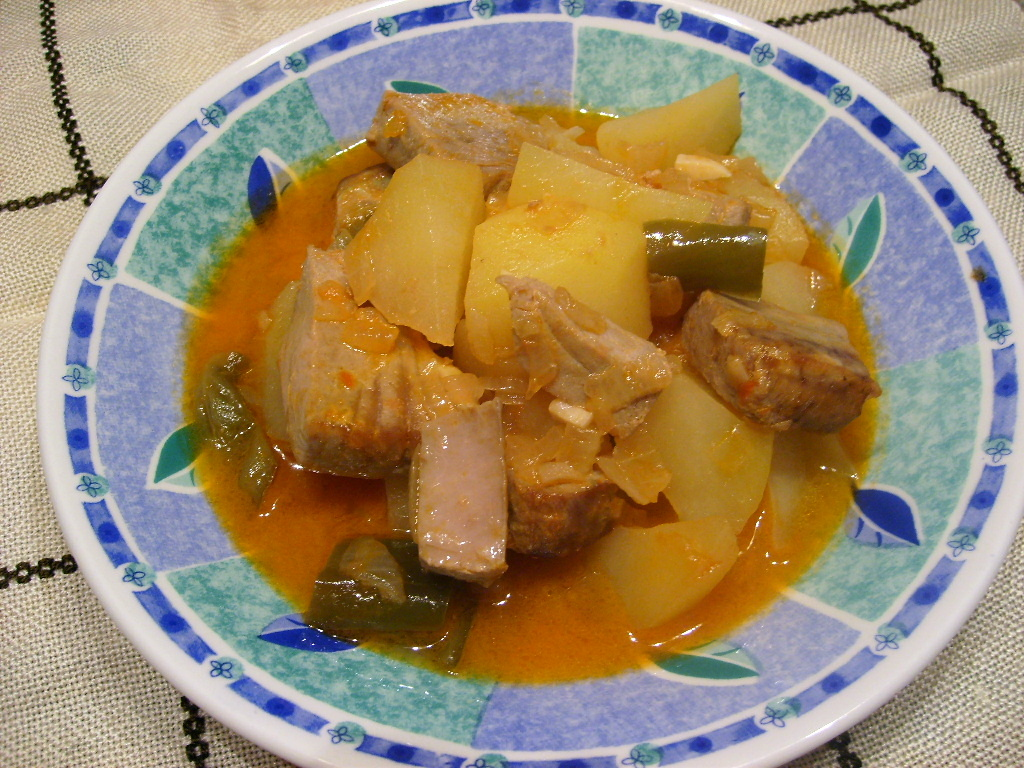
- Alternative names: Marmitako, marmita, marmite and sorropotún
- Type: Stew
- Main ingredients: Potatoes, tuna, onions, peppers, and tomatoes

Tuna pot, also known as marmitako in the Basque Country and as marmita, marmite, or sorropotún in Cantabria, is a fish stew traditionally eaten by tuna fishermen on board boats in the Bay of Biscay and Cantabrian Sea. In its modern form, it combines fresh albacore tuna with potatoes, onions, green peppers, dried choricero peppers, and tomatoes.

== Etymology ==
The name marmitako is composed of the Basque word marmita (a metal cooking pot with a lid, borrowed from French marmite or Spanish marmita) and the Basque suffix -ko ("from" or "of"), giving the literal meaning "from the pot." Along the eastern and central coast of Cantabria the dish is known as marmita or marmite; along the western Cantabrian coast it is called sorropotún in the Cantabrian dialect.

== History ==
The stew originated as a one-pot meal prepared aboard Basque fishing boats during the summer tuna season, using fresh-caught fish, potatoes, and dried peppers — ingredients that kept well during long trips in the Bay of Biscay. The Basque, a seafaring people whose vessels reached the North Atlantic and Greenland from the late Middle Ages, were among the first Europeans to cultivate the potato after its introduction from the Americas, growing it along the coast of the Bay of Biscay by the late 16th century. Once tomatoes and peppers also became established in the Basque larder, they were incorporated into the dish, gradually transforming a sailors' subsistence meal into the modern stew.

In the late 20th century, following the end of the Franco era, marmitako briefly fell out of fashion in restaurants as the Nueva Cocina Vasca movement focused on more refined preparations, but it has since returned to menus across the region in both traditional and modern interpretations.

== Ingredients ==
The fish of authentic marmitako is the albacore tuna (Thunnus alalunga), known in Basque as hegaluze ("long fin") and in Spanish as bonito del norte ("northern bonito"), which migrates close to the Basque coast between approximately July and September. Other essential ingredients are potatoes (traditionally torn into chunks by cracking them with a knife, a method said to release starch and thicken the broth), onions, green peppers, garlic, ripe tomatoes, and the rehydrated pulp of dried choricero peppers, which gives the broth its characteristic red color.

== Preparation ==
Onions, green peppers, and garlic are sautéed until softened, then chunks of potato are added, followed by tomato and choricero pulp. Water or fish stock is added and the stew is simmered until the potatoes are tender and beginning to fall apart, releasing starch into the broth. In modern preparations, raw chunks of tuna are added at the very end of cooking, after the pot has been removed from the heat, so that the residual warmth cooks the fish gently and keeps it tender; on traditional fishing boats, by contrast, the fish was added earlier and tended to overcook.

== Regional variants ==
Within the Spanish Basque Country, marmitako is most strongly associated with the coastal provinces of Bizkaia and Gipuzkoa and is less common in the inland province of Araba. In the northern Basque Country (in France), the closely related but more elaborate fish soup ttoro — which incorporates additional herbs, vegetables, and a wider variety of seafood — largely takes its place.

Marmitako cooking competitions are held during Basque summer festivals, notably during Aste Nagusia (Big Week) in San Sebastián each August.

== See also ==
- Basque cuisine
- Bouillabaisse
- Ttoro
- List of fish stews
