= Goxua =

Spanish multilayered dessert typical of the Basque Country

Goxua (which means "sweet" in Basque) is a typical dessert from the Basque Country, especially from Vitoria-Gasteiz. Jose Murguia from La Peña Dulce invented the original recipe of goxua “1”; the pastry chef from Mirandese Alberto Bornachea affirms that goxua was invented by his father trying to copy crema catalana, baptizing the resulting dessert as cazuelita.

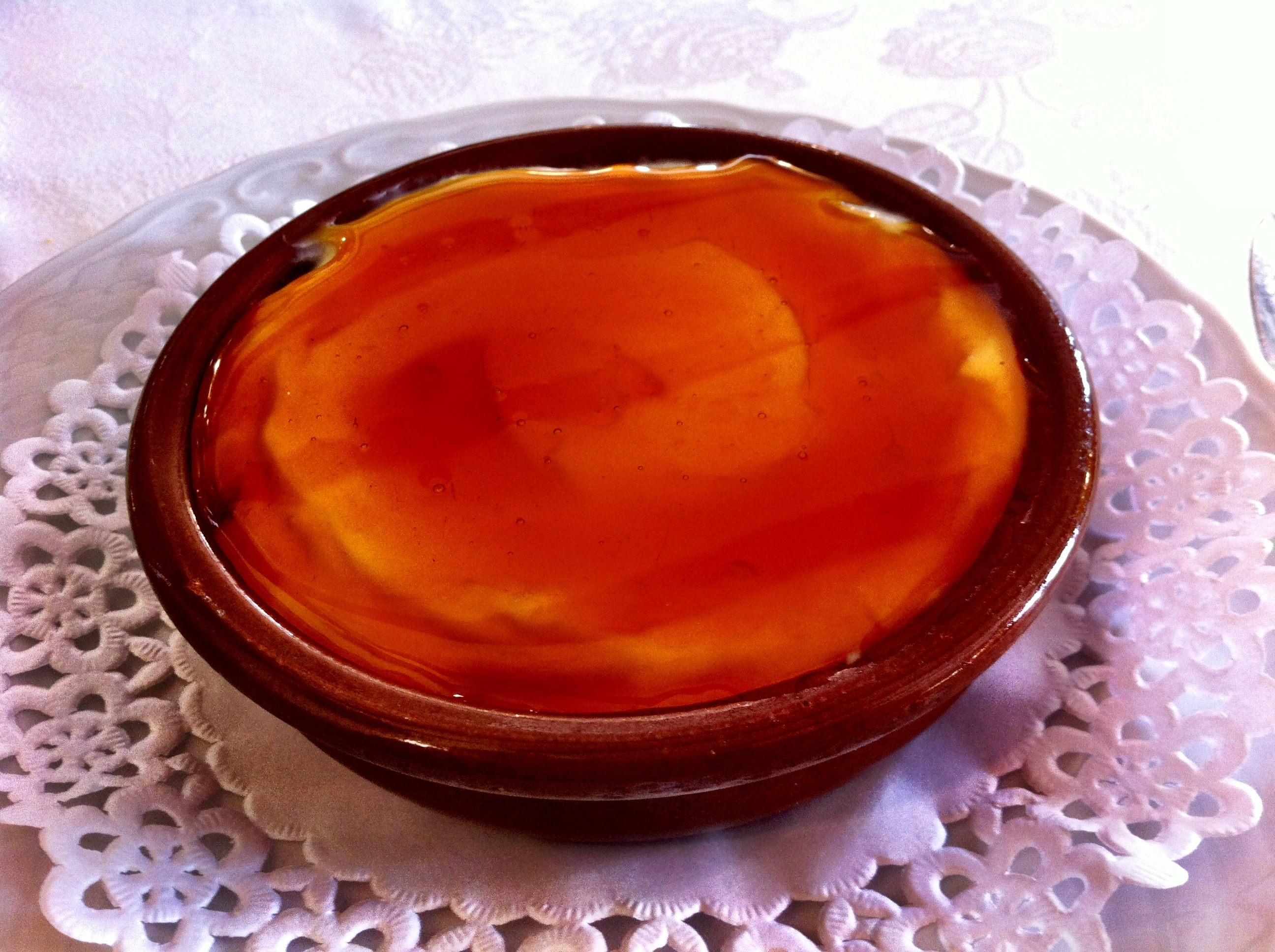
Goxua - Moverelbigote

== Characteristics ==
Goxua consists of a base of whipped cream, one layer of sponge cake and a layer of caramelized custard. In the northern part of the Basque Country, it is usually filled with jam. There are two ways to serve goxua: in individual bowls as if it was custard or curd, or the traditional form of cake in a clay pot.
