= List of restaurants in Barcelona =

This is a list of notable restaurants in Barcelona.

== Restaurants in Barcelona ==
- Àbac (three Michelin stars)
- Alkimia (one Michelin star)
- Caelis (one Michelin star)
- Capritx
- Cinc Sentits (one Michelin star)
- Enoteca (two Michelin star)
- Gaig
- Hisop (one Michelin star)
- Hofmann (one Michelin star)
- Lasarte (three Michelin stars)
- Manairó
- Moments (one Michelin star)
- Via Veneto (one Michelin star)

== Defunct restaurants in Barcelona ==
- Can Fabes (two Michelin stars)
- Comerç 24 (one Michelin star)
- Dos Cielos (one Michelin star)
- Evo (one Michelin star)
- Moo (one Michelin star)
- Neichel (one Michelin star)
- Saüc (one Michelin star)

== See also ==
- List of Michelin-starred restaurants in Barcelona
- Lists of restaurants
