= List of Michelin-starred restaurants in Spain =

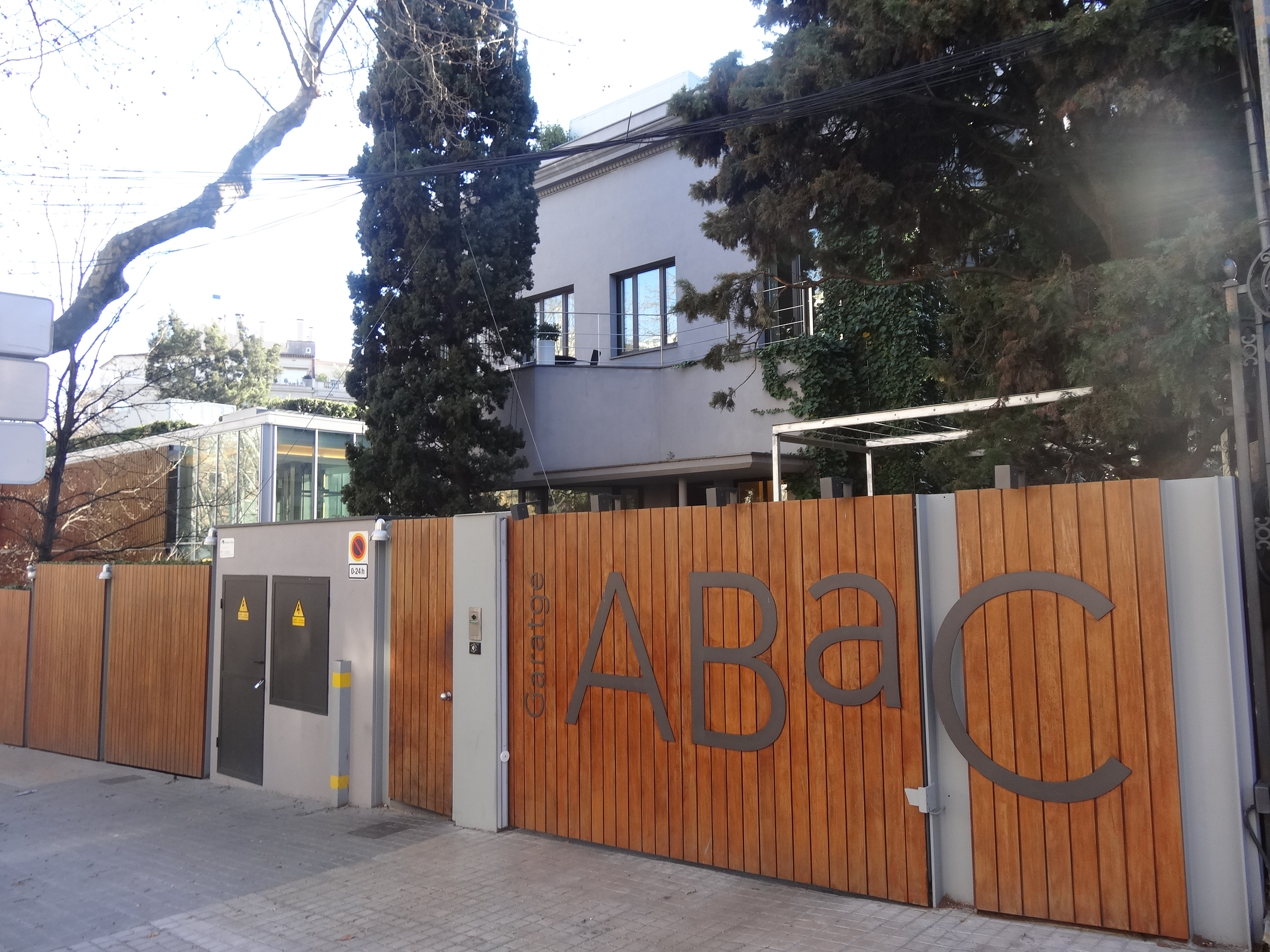
Entrance of ABaC, a three starred restaurant in Barcelona

As of the 2026 Michelin Guide, there are 306 restaurants in Spain with a Michelin star rating.

The Michelin Guides have been published by the French tyre company Michelin since 1900. They were designed as a guide to tell drivers about eateries they recommended to visit and to subtly sponsor their tyres, by encouraging drivers to use their cars more and therefore need to replace the tyres as they wore out. Over time, the stars that were given out became more valuable.

Multiple anonymous Michelin inspectors visit the restaurants several times. They rate the restaurants on five criteria: "quality of products", "mastery of flavor and cooking techniques", "the personality of the chef represented in the dining experience", "value for money", and "consistency between inspectors' visits". Inspectors have at least ten years of expertise and create a list of popular restaurants supported by media reports, reviews, and diner popularity. If they reach a consensus, Michelin awards restaurants from one to three stars based on its evaluation methodology: one star means "high-quality cooking, worth a stop", two stars signify "excellent cooking, worth a detour", and three stars denote "exceptional cuisine, worth a special journey". The stars are not permanent and restaurants are constantly re-evaluated. If the criteria are not met, the restaurant will lose its stars.

Historically, Spain and Portugal were published as a joint-guide and ceremony. In 2024, Portugal was spun off as a separate guide and ceremony. In 2022, Andorra was included with Spain & Portugal and continues to be included in the Spain ceremony.

== Andalusia ==
As of the 2026 Michelin Guide, there are 30 restaurants in Andalusia with a Michelin star rating, which includes the city of Seville.

Key
1 Michelin star	One Michelin star
2 Michelin stars	Two Michelin stars
3 Michelin stars	Three Michelin stars
—	The restaurant did not receive a star that year
Closed	The restaurant is no longer open

Michelin-starred restaurants
Name	Cuisine	Location	2025	2026
Abantal	Creative	Seville	1 Michelin star	1 Michelin star
Acánthum	Spanish	Huelva	1 Michelin star	Closed
Alevante	Creative	Chiclana de la Frontera	2 Michelin stars	2 Michelin stars
Aponiente	Creative	El Puerto de Santa María	3 Michelin stars	3 Michelin stars
Back	Spanish	Marbella	1 Michelin star	1 Michelin star
Bagá	Modern	Jaén	1 Michelin star	1 Michelin star
Bardal	Creative	Ronda	2 Michelin stars	2 Michelin stars
Blossom	Latin American	Málaga	1 Michelin star	1 Michelin star
Cañabota	Seafood	Seville	1 Michelin star	1 Michelin star
Choco	Spanish	Córdoba	1 Michelin star	1 Michelin star
Codigo de Barra	Modern	Cádiz	1 Michelin star	1 Michelin star
Dama Juana	Spanish	Jaén	1 Michelin star	1 Michelin star
Faralá	Spanish	Granada	—	1 Michelin star
José Carlos Garcia	Spanish	Málaga	1 Michelin star	1 Michelin star
Kaleja	Spanish	Málaga	1 Michelin star	1 Michelin star
La Costa	Mediterranean	El Ejido	1 Michelin star	1 Michelin star
La Finca	Spanish	Loja	1 Michelin star	Closed
LÚ Cocina y Alma	Modern	Jerez	2 Michelin stars	2 Michelin stars
Malak	Spanish	Jaén	1 Michelin star	1 Michelin star
Mantúa	Modern	Jerez	1 Michelin star	1 Michelin star
Mare	Spanish	Cádiz	—	1 Michelin star
Mesón Sabor Andaluz	Spanish	Alcalá del Valle	1 Michelin star	1 Michelin star
Messina	Creative	Marbella	1 Michelin star	1 Michelin star
Nintai	Japanese	Marbella	1 Michelin star	1 Michelin star
Noor	Creative	Córdoba	3 Michelin stars	3 Michelin stars
Ochando	Spanish	Los Rosales	—	1 Michelin star
Palodú	Spanish	Málaga	—	1 Michelin star
Radis	Modern	Jaén	1 Michelin star	1 Michelin star
ReComiendo	Creative	Córdoba	—	1 Michelin star
Skina	Modern	Marbella	2 Michelin stars	2 Michelin stars
Sollo	Creative	Fuengirola	1 Michelin star	1 Michelin star
Tohqa	Spanish	El Puerto de Santa María	1 Michelin star	Closed
Vandelvira	Modern	Baeza	1 Michelin star	1 Michelin star
Reference(s)				

== Aragon ==
As of the 2026 Michelin Guide, there are 11 restaurants in Aragon with a Michelin star rating.

Key
1 Michelin star	One Michelin star
—	The restaurant did not receive a star that year

Michelin-starred restaurants
Name	Cuisine	Location	2025	2026
Ansils	Contemporary	Anciles	1 Michelin star	1 Michelin star
Callizo	Creative	Ainsa	1 Michelin star	1 Michelin star
Cancook	Creative	Zaragoza	1 Michelin star	—
Canfranc Express	Contemporary	Canfranc-Estación	1 Michelin star	1 Michelin star
Casa Arcas	Modern	Villanova	1 Michelin star	1 Michelin star
Casa Rubén	Creative	Tella	—	1 Michelin star
Gente Rara	Creative	Zaragoza	1 Michelin star	1 Michelin star
Hospedería El Batán	Modern	Tramacastilla	1 Michelin star	1 Michelin star
La Era de los Nogales	Modern	Sardas	1 Michelin star	1 Michelin star
La Prensa	Modern	Zaragoza	1 Michelin star	1 Michelin star
Lillas Pastia	Modern	Huesca	1 Michelin star	1 Michelin star
Tatau	Spanish	Huesca	1 Michelin star	1 Michelin star
Reference(s)				

== Asturias ==
As of the 2026 Michelin Guide, there are 12 restaurants in Principality of Asturias with a Michelin star rating.

Key
1 Michelin star	One Michelin star
3 Michelin stars	Three Michelin stars
—	The restaurant did not receive a star that year

Michelin-starred restaurants
Name	Cuisine	Location	2025	2026
Auga	Spanish	Gijón	1 Michelin star	1 Michelin star
Ayalga	Modern	Ribadesella	1 Michelin star	1 Michelin star
Casa Gerardo	Modern	Prendes	1 Michelin star	1 Michelin star
Casa Marcial	Spanish	Arriondas	3 Michelin stars	3 Michelin stars
El Corral del Indianu	Modern	Arriondas	1 Michelin star	1 Michelin star
El Retiro	Modern	Llanes	1 Michelin star	1 Michelin star
Ferpel	Spanish	Ortiguera	1 Michelin star	1 Michelin star
Marcos	Modern	Gijón	1 Michelin star	1 Michelin star
Monte	Modern	San Feliz	1 Michelin star	1 Michelin star
NM	Creative	Oviedo	1 Michelin star	1 Michelin star
Real Balneario	Spanish	Salinas	1 Michelin star	1 Michelin star
Regueiro	Indian / Spanish	Tox	—	1 Michelin star
Reference(s)				

== Balearic Islands ==
As of the 2026 Michelin Guide, there are 13 restaurants in the Balearic Islands with a Michelin star rating, which includes the islands of Ibiza and Mallorca.

Key
1 Michelin star	One Michelin star
2 Michelin stars	Two Michelin stars
—	The restaurant did not receive a star that year
Closed	The restaurant is no longer open

Michelin-starred restaurants
Name	Cuisine	Location	2024	2025	2026
Adrián Quetglas	Modern	Palma de Mallorca	1 Michelin star	—	—
Andreu Genestra	Creative	Llucmajor	1 Michelin star	1 Michelin star	1 Michelin star
Béns d’Avall	Spanish	Sóller	1 Michelin star	1 Michelin star	1 Michelin star
DINS Santi Taura	Modern	Palma de Mallorca	1 Michelin star	1 Michelin star	1 Michelin star
Es Fum	Mediterranean	Palmanova	1 Michelin star	1 Michelin star	1 Michelin star
Es Tragón	Creative	Sant Antoni de Portmany	1 Michelin star	1 Michelin star	Closed
Etxeco	Mediterranean	Es Canar	1 Michelin star	1 Michelin star	Closed
Fusion19	Fusion	Muro	1 Michelin star	1 Michelin star	1 Michelin star
La Gaia	Fusion	Eivissa	1 Michelin star	1 Michelin star	1 Michelin star
Maca de Castro	Creative	Port d'Alcúdia	1 Michelin star	1 Michelin star	1 Michelin star
Marc Fosh	Spanish	Palma de Mallorca	1 Michelin star	1 Michelin star	1 Michelin star
Omakase by Walt	Japanese	Eivissa	1 Michelin star	1 Michelin star	1 Michelin star
Sa Clastra	Creative	Es Capdellà	1 Michelin star	1 Michelin star	1 Michelin star
Unic	Innovative	Sant Josep de sa Talaia	1 Michelin star	1 Michelin star	1 Michelin star
Voro	Modern	Canyamel	2 Michelin stars	2 Michelin stars	2 Michelin stars
Zaranda	Creative	Palma de Mallorca	1 Michelin star	1 Michelin star	1 Michelin star
Reference(s)					

== Basque Country ==
As of the 2026 Michelin Guide, there are 26 restaurants in the Basque Country (Euskadi) with a Michelin star rating, which includes the cities of Bilbao and San Sebastián (Donostia).

Key
1 Michelin star	One Michelin star
2 Michelin stars	Two Michelin stars
3 Michelin stars	Three Michelin stars
—	The restaurant did not receive a star that year

Michelin-starred restaurants
Name	Cuisine	Location	2025	2026
Akelaŕe	Creative	San Sebastián	3 Michelin stars	3 Michelin stars
Alameda	Basque	Hondarribia	—	1 Michelin star
Ama	Basque	Tolosa	1 Michelin star	1 Michelin star
Amelia by Paulo Airaudo	Italian / Japanese	San Sebastián	2 Michelin stars	2 Michelin stars
Andra Mari	Basque	Galdakao	1 Michelin star	1 Michelin star
ARREA!	Basque	Santa Cruz de Campezo	1 Michelin star	1 Michelin star
Arzak	Creative	San Sebastián	3 Michelin stars	3 Michelin stars
Azurmendi	Creative	Larrabetzu	3 Michelin stars	3 Michelin stars
Bakea	Basque	Mungia	—	1 Michelin star
Boroa	Basque	Etxano	1 Michelin star	1 Michelin star
Elkano	Seafood	Getaria	1 Michelin star	1 Michelin star
Eneko	Basque	Larrabetzu	1 Michelin star	1 Michelin star
Etxebarri	Grill	Axpe	1 Michelin star	1 Michelin star
Garena	Basque	Dina	1 Michelin star	1 Michelin star
iBAi by Paulo Airaudo	Basque	San Sebastián	1 Michelin star	1 Michelin star
Islares	Creative	Bilbao	—	1 Michelin star
Itzuli	Modern	San Sebastián	—	1 Michelin star
Kokoxta	Modern	San Sebastián	1 Michelin star	1 Michelin star
La Revelía	Basque	Amorebieta	—	1 Michelin star
Martin Berasategui	Creative	Lasarte - Oria	3 Michelin stars	3 Michelin stars
Mina	Creative	Bilbao	1 Michelin star	1 Michelin star
Mugaritz	Innovative	Errenteria	2 Michelin stars	2 Michelin stars
Nerua Guggenheim Bilbao	Basque	Bilbao	1 Michelin star	1 Michelin star
Ola Martín Berasategui	Modern	Bilbao	1 Michelin star	1 Michelin star
Txispa	Creative	Axpe	1 Michelin star	1 Michelin star
Zarate	Seafood	Bilbao	1 Michelin star	1 Michelin star
Reference(s)				

== Canary Islands ==
As of the 2026 Michelin Guide, there are 15 restaurants in the Canary Islands with a Michelin star rating.

Key
1 Michelin star	One Michelin star
2 Michelin stars	Two Michelin stars
—	The restaurant did not receive a star that year

Michelin-starred restaurants
Name	Cuisine	Location	2025	2026
Donaire	Spanish	Tenerife – Adeje	1 Michelin star	1 Michelin star
El Rincón de Juan Carlos	Creative	Tenerife – Adeje	2 Michelin stars	2 Michelin stars
El Taller Seve Díaz	Spanish	Tenerife – Puerto de la Cruz	—	1 Michelin star
Haydée by Víctor Sánchez	Spanish	Tenerife – La Orotava	1 Michelin star	1 Michelin star
Il Bocconcino	Italian	Tenerife – Adeje	1 Michelin star	1 Michelin star
Kamezí	Creative	Lanzarote – Playa Blanca	1 Michelin star	1 Michelin star
La Aquarela	Creative	Gran Canaria – Arguineguín	1 Michelin star	1 Michelin star
Los Guayres	Spanish	Gran Canaria – Mogán	1 Michelin star	1 Michelin star
M.B (Note: Was named MB by Martín Berasategui until 2025)	Contemporary	Tenerife – Guía de Isora	2 Michelin stars	2 Michelin stars
Muxgo	Creative	Gran Canaria – Las Palmas	1 Michelin star	1 Michelin star
Nub	Creative	Tenerife – San Cristóbal de La Laguna	1 Michelin star	1 Michelin star
Poemas by Hermanos Padrón	Creative	Gran Canaria – Las Palmas	1 Michelin star	1 Michelin star
San Hô	Japanese / Peruvian	Tenerife – Adeje	1 Michelin star	1 Michelin star
Tabaiba	Creative	Gran Canaria – Las Palmas	1 Michelin star	1 Michelin star
Taste 1973	Argentine	Tenerife – Playa de las Américas	1 Michelin star	1 Michelin star
Reference(s)				

== Cantabria ==
As of the 2026 Michelin Guide, there are 6 restaurants in Cantabria with a Michelin star rating.

Key
1 Michelin star	One Michelin star
3 Michelin stars	Three Michelin stars
—	The restaurant did not receive a star that year

Michelin-starred restaurants
Name	Cuisine	Location	2025	2026
Casona del Judío	Modern	Santander	1 Michelin star	1 Michelin star
Cenador de Amós	Modern	Villaverde de Pontones	3 Michelin stars	3 Michelin stars
El Serbal	Modern	Santander	1 Michelin star	1 Michelin star
La Bicicleta	Modern	Hoznayo	1 Michelin star	1 Michelin star
Pico Velasco	Modern	Carasa	—	1 Michelin star
Solana	Modern	Ampuero	1 Michelin star	1 Michelin star
Reference(s)				

== Castile and León ==
As of the 2026 Michelin Guide, there are 19 restaurants in Castile and León with a Michelin star rating.

Key
1 Michelin star	One Michelin star
Closed	The restaurant is no longer open

Michelin-starred restaurants
Name	Cuisine	Location	2025	2026
Alejandro Serrano	Modern	Miranda de Ebro	1 Michelin star	1 Michelin star
Alquimia - Laboratorio	Creative	Valladolid	1 Michelin star	1 Michelin star
Ambivium	Modern	Peñafiel	1 Michelin star	1 Michelin star
Baluarte	Modern	Soria	1 Michelin star	Closed
Barro	Creative	Ávila	1 Michelin star	1 Michelin star
Cobo Evolución	Modern	Burgos	1 Michelin star	1 Michelin star
Cocinandos	Modern	Leon	1 Michelin star	1 Michelin star
El Ermitaño	Spanish	Benavente	1 Michelin star	1 Michelin star
En la Parra	Spanish	Salamanca	1 Michelin star	1 Michelin star
Erre de Roca	Spanish	Miranda de Ebro	1 Michelin star	1 Michelin star
La Botica de Matapozuelos	Spanish	Matapozuelos	1 Michelin star	1 Michelin star
La Lobita	Creative	Castroverde de Campos	1 Michelin star	1 Michelin star
Lera	Spanish	Miranda de Ebro	1 Michelin star	1 Michelin star
Mu•na	Japanese	Ponferrada	1 Michelin star	1 Michelin star
Pablo	Spanish	Leon	1 Michelin star	1 Michelin star
Refectorio	Creative	Sardón de Duero	1 Michelin star	1 Michelin star
Ricardo Temiño	Spanish	Burgos	1 Michelin star	1 Michelin star
Taller Arzuaga	Creative	Quintanilla de Onésimo	1 Michelin star	1 Michelin star
Trigo	Modern	Valladolid	1 Michelin star	1 Michelin star
Victor Gutiérrez	Peruvian / Spanish	Salamanca	1 Michelin star	1 Michelin star
Reference(s)				

== Castilla–La Mancha ==
As of the 2026 Michelin Guide, there are 12 restaurants in Castilla–La Mancha with a Michelin star rating.

Key
1 Michelin star	One Michelin star
2 Michelin stars	Two Michelin stars

Michelin-starred restaurants
Name	Cuisine	Location	2025	2026
Ababol	Spanish	Albacete	1 Michelin star	1 Michelin star
Casas Colgadas Restaurante	Spanish	Cuenca	1 Michelin star	1 Michelin star
Coto de Quevedo Evolución	Spanish	Torre de Juan Abad	1 Michelin star	1 Michelin star
El Bohío	Modern	Illescas	1 Michelin star	1 Michelin star
El Doncel	Modern	Sigüenza	1 Michelin star	1 Michelin star
El Molino de Alcuneza	Modern	Sigüenza	1 Michelin star	1 Michelin star
Epílogo	Modern	Tomelloso	1 Michelin star	1 Michelin star
Iván Cerdeño	Modern	Toledo	2 Michelin stars	2 Michelin stars
Maralba	Spanish	Almansa	2 Michelin stars	2 Michelin stars
Oba-	Creative	Casas-Ibáñez	1 Michelin star	1 Michelin star
Raíces-Carlos Maldonado	Creative	Talavera de la Reina	1 Michelin star	1 Michelin star
Retama	Modern	Torrenueva	1 Michelin star	1 Michelin star
Reference(s)				

== Catalonia ==
As of the 2026 Michelin Guide, there are 62 restaurants in Catalonia with a Michelin star rating, which includes the city of Barcelona.

Key
1 Michelin star	One Michelin star
2 Michelin stars	Two Michelin stars
3 Michelin stars	Three Michelin stars
—	The restaurant did not receive a star that year
Closed	The restaurant is no longer open

Michelin-starred restaurants
Name	Cuisine	Location	2025	2026
ABaC	Creative	Barcelona – Sarrià-Sant Gervasi	3 Michelin stars	3 Michelin stars
Aleia	Creative	Barcelona – Gràcia	1 Michelin star	2 Michelin stars
Alkimia	Catalan	Barcelona – Eixample	1 Michelin star	1 Michelin star
Angle	Modern	Barcelona – Eixample	1 Michelin star	1 Michelin star
Atempo	Modern	Barcelona – Eixample	1 Michelin star	1 Michelin star
Aürt	Modern	Barcelona – Sant Martí	1 Michelin star	Closed
Bo.TiC	Mediterranean	Corçà	2 Michelin stars	2 Michelin stars
Ca l'Enric	Catalan	La Vall de Bianya	1 Michelin star	1 Michelin star
Caelis	French	Barcelona – Ciutat Vella	1 Michelin star	1 Michelin star
Can Bosch	Catalan	Cambrils	1 Michelin star	1 Michelin star
Can Jubany	Catalan	Calldetenes	1 Michelin star	1 Michelin star
Castell Peralada	Catalan	Peralada	1 Michelin star	1 Michelin star
Casa Nova	Modern	Sant Martí Sarroca	1 Michelin star	1 Michelin star
Cinc Sentits	Creative	Barcelona – Eixample	2 Michelin stars	2 Michelin stars
Citrus del Tancat	Mediterranean	Alcanar	1 Michelin star	1 Michelin star
Cocina Hermanos Torres	Creative	Barcelona – Les Corts	3 Michelin stars	3 Michelin stars
COME by Paco Méndez	Mexican	Barcelona – Eixample	1 Michelin star	1 Michelin star
Deliranto	Modern	Salou	1 Michelin star	1 Michelin star
Disfrutar	Creative	Barcelona – Eixample	3 Michelin stars	3 Michelin stars
Divinum	Catalan	Girona	1 Michelin star	1 Michelin star
Dos Palillos	Asian Fusion	Barcelona – Ciutat Vella	1 Michelin star	1 Michelin star
El Celler de Can Roca	Creative	Girona	3 Michelin stars	3 Michelin stars
Els Casals	Catalan	Sagàs	1 Michelin star	1 Michelin star
Enigma	Creative	Barcelona – Eixample	1 Michelin star	2 Michelin stars
Esperit Roca	Creative	Sant Julià de Ramis	1 Michelin star	1 Michelin star
Els Tinars	Catalan	Llagostera	1 Michelin star	1 Michelin star
Emporium	Modern	Castelló d'Empúries	1 Michelin star	1 Michelin star
Enoteca Paco Pérez	Mediterranean	Barcelona – Ciutat Vella	2 Michelin stars	2 Michelin stars
Fishølogy	Mediterranean	Barcelona – Eixample	1 Michelin star	1 Michelin star
Fogony	Modern	Sort	1 Michelin star	1 Michelin star
Hisop	Catalan	Barcelona – Sarrià-Sant Gervasi	1 Michelin star	1 Michelin star
Hofmann	Modern	Barcelona – Sarrià-Sant Gervasi	1 Michelin star	1 Michelin star
Kamikaze	Asian Fusion	Barcelona – Eixample	—	1 Michelin star
Koy Shunka	Japanese	Barcelona – Ciutat Vella	1 Michelin star	1 Michelin star
L'Aliança d'Anglès	Catalan	Anglès	1 Michelin star	1 Michelin star
L'Antic Molí	Catalan	Ulldecona	1 Michelin star	1 Michelin star
L'Ó	Modern	Sant Fruitós de Bages	1 Michelin star	1 Michelin star
La Boscana	Creative	Bellvis	1 Michelin star	2 Michelin stars
La Fonda Xesc	Modern	Gombrèn	1 Michelin star	1 Michelin star
Lasarte	Creative	Barcelona – Eixample	3 Michelin stars	3 Michelin stars
Les Cols	Creative	Olot	2 Michelin stars	2 Michelin stars
Les Magnòlies	Modern	Arbúcies	1 Michelin star	1 Michelin star
Les Moles	Modern	Ulldecona	1 Michelin star	1 Michelin star
Lluerna	Catalan	Santa Coloma de Gramenet	1 Michelin star	1 Michelin star
MAE Barcelona	Creative	Barcelona – Sarrià-Sant Gervasi	1 Michelin star	1 Michelin star
Malena	Modern	Gimenells i el Pla de la Font	1 Michelin star	1 Michelin star
Massana	Modern	Girona	1 Michelin star	1 Michelin star
Miramar	Seafood	Llançà	2 Michelin stars	2 Michelin stars
Moments	Catalan	Barcelona – Eixample	1 Michelin star	1 Michelin star
Mont Bar	Creative	Barcelona – Eixample	1 Michelin star	2 Michelin stars
Oria	Basque	Barcelona – Eixample	1 Michelin star	Closed
Prodigi	Modern	Barcelona – Eixample	1 Michelin star	1 Michelin star
Quatre Molins	Creative	Cornudella de Montsant	1 Michelin star	1 Michelin star
Quirat	Catalan	Barcelona – Sants-Montjuïc	1 Michelin star	1 Michelin star
Rincón de Diego	Catalan	Cambrils	1 Michelin star	1 Michelin star
Sala	Catalan	Olost	1 Michelin star	1 Michelin star
SCAPAR	Catalan / Japanese	Barcelona – Sarrià-Sant Gervasi	—	1 Michelin star
Slow & Low	International	Barcelona – Eixample	1 Michelin star	1 Michelin star
Suto	Japanese	Barcelona – Sants-Montjuïc	1 Michelin star	1 Michelin star
Teatro kitchen & bar	Contemporary	Barcelona – Eixample	1 Michelin star	1 Michelin star
Tresmacarrons	Modern	El Masnou	1 Michelin star	1 Michelin star
Via Veneto	Spanish	Barcelona – Sarrià-Sant Gervasi	1 Michelin star	1 Michelin star
Villa Retiro	Catalan	Xerta	1 Michelin star	1 Michelin star
Voramar	Mediterranean	Portbou	1 Michelin star	1 Michelin star
Reference(s)				

== Extremadura ==
As of the 2026 Michelin Guide, there are 2 restaurants in Extremadura with a Michelin star rating.

Key
1 Michelin star	One Michelin star
3 Michelin stars	Three Michelin stars

Michelin-starred restaurants
Name	Cuisine	Location	2025	2026
Atrio	Creative	Cáceres	3 Michelin stars	3 Michelin stars
Versátil	Spanish	Zarza de Granadilla	1 Michelin star	1 Michelin star
Reference(s)				

== Galicia ==
As of the 2026 Michelin Guide, there are 19 restaurants in Galicia with a Michelin star rating.

Key
1 Michelin star	One Michelin star
2 Michelin stars	Two Michelin stars
—	The restaurant did not receive a star that year

Michelin-starred restaurants
Name	Cuisine	Location	2025	2026
A Tafona	Spanish	Santiago de Compostela	1 Michelin star	1 Michelin star
Árbore da Veira	Creative	A Coruña	1 Michelin star	1 Michelin star
As Garzas	Galician	Barizo	1 Michelin star	1 Michelin star
Casa Marcelo	Fusion	Santiago de Compostela	1 Michelin star	1 Michelin star
Ceibe	Galician	Ourense	1 Michelin star	1 Michelin star
Culler de Pau	Creative	O Grove	2 Michelin stars	2 Michelin stars
Eirado	Galician	Pontevedra	1 Michelin star	1 Michelin star
Miguel González	Galician	Ourense	—	1 Michelin star
Maruja Limón	Spanish	Vigo	1 Michelin star	1 Michelin star
Nova	Galician	Ourense	1 Michelin star	1 Michelin star
O'Pazo	Grills	Padrón	1 Michelin star	1 Michelin star
Pepe Vieira	Creative	Raxó	2 Michelin stars	2 Michelin stars
Retiro da Costiña	Modern	Santa Comba	2 Michelin stars	2 Michelin stars
Silabario	Galician	Vigo	1 Michelin star	1 Michelin star
Simpar	Galician	Santiago de Compostela	1 Michelin star	1 Michelin star
Solla	Creative	San Salvador de Poio	1 Michelin star	1 Michelin star
Terra	Modern	Fisterra	1 Michelin star	1 Michelin star
Vértigo	Galician	Sober	—	1 Michelin star
Yayo Daporta	Galician	Cambados	1 Michelin star	1 Michelin star
Reference(s)				

== La Rioja ==
As of the 2026 Michelin Guide, there are 6 restaurants in La Rioja with a Michelin star rating.

Key
1 Michelin star	One Michelin star
2 Michelin stars	Two Michelin stars

Michelin-starred restaurants
Name	Cuisine	Location	2025	2026
Ajonegro	Fusion	Logrono	1 Michelin star	1 Michelin star
El Portal de Echaurren	Creative	Ezcaray	2 Michelin stars	2 Michelin stars
Ikaro	Creative	Logrono	1 Michelin star	1 Michelin star
Kiro Sushi	Japanese	Logrono	1 Michelin star	1 Michelin star
Nublo	Modern	Haro	1 Michelin star	1 Michelin star
Venta Moncalvillo	Modern	Daroca de Rioja	2 Michelin stars	2 Michelin stars
Reference(s)				

== Madrid ==
As of the 2026 Michelin Guide, there are 35 restaurants in the Community of Madrid with a Michelin star rating.

Key
1 Michelin star	One Michelin star
2 Michelin stars	Two Michelin stars
3 Michelin stars	Three Michelin stars
—	The restaurant did not receive a star that year

Michelin-starred restaurants
Name	Cuisine	Location	2025	2026
A'Barra	International	Madrid – Chamartín	1 Michelin star	1 Michelin star
Ancestral	Modern	Pozuelo de Alarcón	—	1 Michelin star
CEBO	Creative	Madrid – Centro	1 Michelin star	1 Michelin star
Chirón	Modern	Valdemoro	1 Michelin star	1 Michelin star
Chispa Bistró	Modern	Madrid – Centro	1 Michelin star	1 Michelin star
Clos Madrid	Modern	Madrid – Chamberí	1 Michelin star	1 Michelin star
Coque	Creative	Madrid – Chamberí	2 Michelin stars	2 Michelin stars
Corral de la Morería Gastronómico	Modern	Madrid – Centro	1 Michelin star	1 Michelin star
Deessa	Creative	Madrid – Retiro	2 Michelin stars	2 Michelin stars
Desde 1911	Seafood	Madrid – Moncloa-Aravaca	1 Michelin star	1 Michelin star
DiverXO	Creative	Madrid – Chamartín	3 Michelin stars	3 Michelin stars
DSTAgE	Creative	Madrid – Centro	2 Michelin stars	2 Michelin stars
El Invernadero	Vegetarian	Madrid – Chamberí	1 Michelin star	1 Michelin star
Emi	Modern	Madrid – Chamberí	—	1 Michelin star
Eter	Spanish	Madrid – Arganzuela	—	1 Michelin star
Gaytán	Modern	Madrid – Chamartín	1 Michelin star	1 Michelin star
Gofio	Spanish	Madrid – Centro	1 Michelin star	1 Michelin star
La Casa de Manolo Franco	Spanish	Valdemorillo	1 Michelin star	1 Michelin star
La Tasquería	Modern	Madrid – Chamberí	1 Michelin star	1 Michelin star
Montia	Modern	San Lorenzo de El Escorial	1 Michelin star	1 Michelin star
OSA	Modern	Madrid – Moncloa-Aravaca	1 Michelin star	1 Michelin star
Pabu	Creative	Madrid – Chamartín	1 Michelin star	1 Michelin star
Paco Roncero	Creative	Madrid – Centro	2 Michelin stars	2 Michelin stars
Quimbaya	Colombian	Madrid – Chamberí	1 Michelin star	1 Michelin star
Ramón Freixa Atelier	Creative	Madrid – Salamanca	—	2 Michelin stars
RavioXO	Creative	Madrid – Tetuán	1 Michelin star	1 Michelin star
Ricardo Sanz Wellington	Japanese	Madrid – Salamanca	1 Michelin star	1 Michelin star
Saddle	Modern	Madrid – Chamberí	1 Michelin star	1 Michelin star
Santerra	Spanish	Madrid – Salamanca	1 Michelin star	1 Michelin star
Sen Omakase	Japanese	Madrid – Chamartín	1 Michelin star	1 Michelin star
Smoked Room	Spanish	Madrid – Chamberí	2 Michelin stars	2 Michelin stars
Toki	Japanese	Madrid – Centro	1 Michelin star	1 Michelin star
Ugo Chan	Japanese	Madrid – Chamartín	1 Michelin star	1 Michelin star
VelascoAbellà	Spanish	Madrid – Chamartín	1 Michelin star	1 Michelin star
Yugo The Bunker	Japanese	Madrid – Centro	1 Michelin star	1 Michelin star
Reference(s)				

== Murcia ==
As of the 2026 Michelin Guide, there are 5 restaurants in the Region of Murcia with a Michelin star rating.

Key
1 Michelin star	One Michelin star
2 Michelin stars	Two Michelin stars
—	The restaurant did not receive a star that year

Michelin-starred restaurants
Name	Cuisine	Location	2025	2026
Almo de Juan Guillamón	Modern	Murcia	1 Michelin star	1 Michelin star
Barahonda	Modern	Yecla	—	1 Michelin star
Cabaña Buenavista	Creative	El Palmar	2 Michelin stars	2 Michelin stars
Frases	Modern	Murcia	1 Michelin star	1 Michelin star
Magoga	Spanish	Cartagena	1 Michelin star	1 Michelin star
Reference(s)				

== Navarre ==
As of the 2026 Michelin Guide, there are 5 restaurants in the Chartered Community of Navarre with a Michelin star rating.

Key
1 Michelin star	One Michelin star
2 Michelin stars	Two Michelin stars

Michelin-starred restaurants
Name	Cuisine	Location	2025	2026
Europa	Basque	Pamplona	1 Michelin star	1 Michelin star
Kabo	Spanish	Pamplona	1 Michelin star	1 Michelin star
Molino de Urdániz	Creative	Urdaitz	2 Michelin stars	2 Michelin stars
Rodero	Modern	Pamplona	1 Michelin star	1 Michelin star
Reference(s)				

== Valencia ==
As of the 2026 Michelin Guide, there are 29 restaurants in the Community of Valencia with a Michelin star rating.

Key
1 Michelin star	One Michelin star
2 Michelin stars	Two Michelin stars
3 Michelin stars	Three Michelin stars
—	The restaurant did not receive a star that year

Michelin-starred restaurants
Name	Cuisine	Location	2025	2026
Arrels	Spanish	Sagunt	1 Michelin star	1 Michelin star
Atalaya	Spanish	Alcossebre	1 Michelin star	1 Michelin star
Audrey's	Spanish	Calp	1 Michelin star	1 Michelin star
Baeza & Rufete	Modern	Alacant	1 Michelin star	1 Michelin star
Beat	French	Calp	1 Michelin star	1 Michelin star
BonAmb	Creative	Xàbia	2 Michelin stars	2 Michelin stars
Cal Paradis	Spanish	Vall d'Alba	1 Michelin star	1 Michelin star
Casa Bernardi	Italian	Benissa	1 Michelin star	1 Michelin star
Casa Pepa	Creative	Ondara	1 Michelin star	1 Michelin star
El Poblet	Creative	Valencia	2 Michelin stars	2 Michelin stars
El Xato	Mediterranean	La Nucía	1 Michelin star	1 Michelin star
Fierro	Modern	Valencia	1 Michelin star	1 Michelin star
Fraula	Spanish	Valencia	1 Michelin star	1 Michelin star
Kaido Sushi Bar	Japanese	Valencia	1 Michelin star	1 Michelin star
L'Escaleta	Mediterranean	Cocentaina	2 Michelin stars	2 Michelin stars
La Finca	Creative	Elche	1 Michelin star	1 Michelin star
La Salta	Creative	Valencia	1 Michelin star	1 Michelin star
Lienzo	Mediterranean	Valencia	1 Michelin star	1 Michelin star
Llavor	Spanish	Oropesa del Mar	—	1 Michelin star
Origen	Spanish	Carcaixent	1 Michelin star	1 Michelin star
Orobianco	Italian	Calp	1 Michelin star	1 Michelin star
Peix & Brases	Mediterranean	Dénia	1 Michelin star	1 Michelin star
Quique Dacosta	Creative	Dénia	3 Michelin stars	3 Michelin stars
Raúl Resino	Seafood	Benicarló	1 Michelin star	1 Michelin star
Ricard Camarena	Creative	Valencia	2 Michelin stars	2 Michelin stars
Rubén Miralles	Modern	Vinaròs	—	1 Michelin star
Riff	Creative	Valencia	1 Michelin star	1 Michelin star
Simposio	Spanish	San Antonio de Benagéber	—	1 Michelin star
Tula	Mediterranean	Xàbia	1 Michelin star	1 Michelin star
Reference(s)				

== Andorra ==
Although Andorra is a separate country, its Michelin-starred restaurants are reviewed and awarded as part of the Michelin Guide Spain. As of the 2026 guide, the country has one Michelin-starred restaurant:

Key
1 Michelin star	One Michelin star

Michelin-starred restaurants
Name	Cuisine	Location	2021	2022	2023	2024	2025	2026
Ibaya	European	Canillo – Soldeu	1 Michelin star	1 Michelin star	1 Michelin star	1 Michelin star	1 Michelin star	1 Michelin star
Reference(s)								

== See also ==
- List of Michelin 3-star restaurants
- List of Michelin-starred restaurants in Portugal
