= Resort =

Self-contained vacation establishment

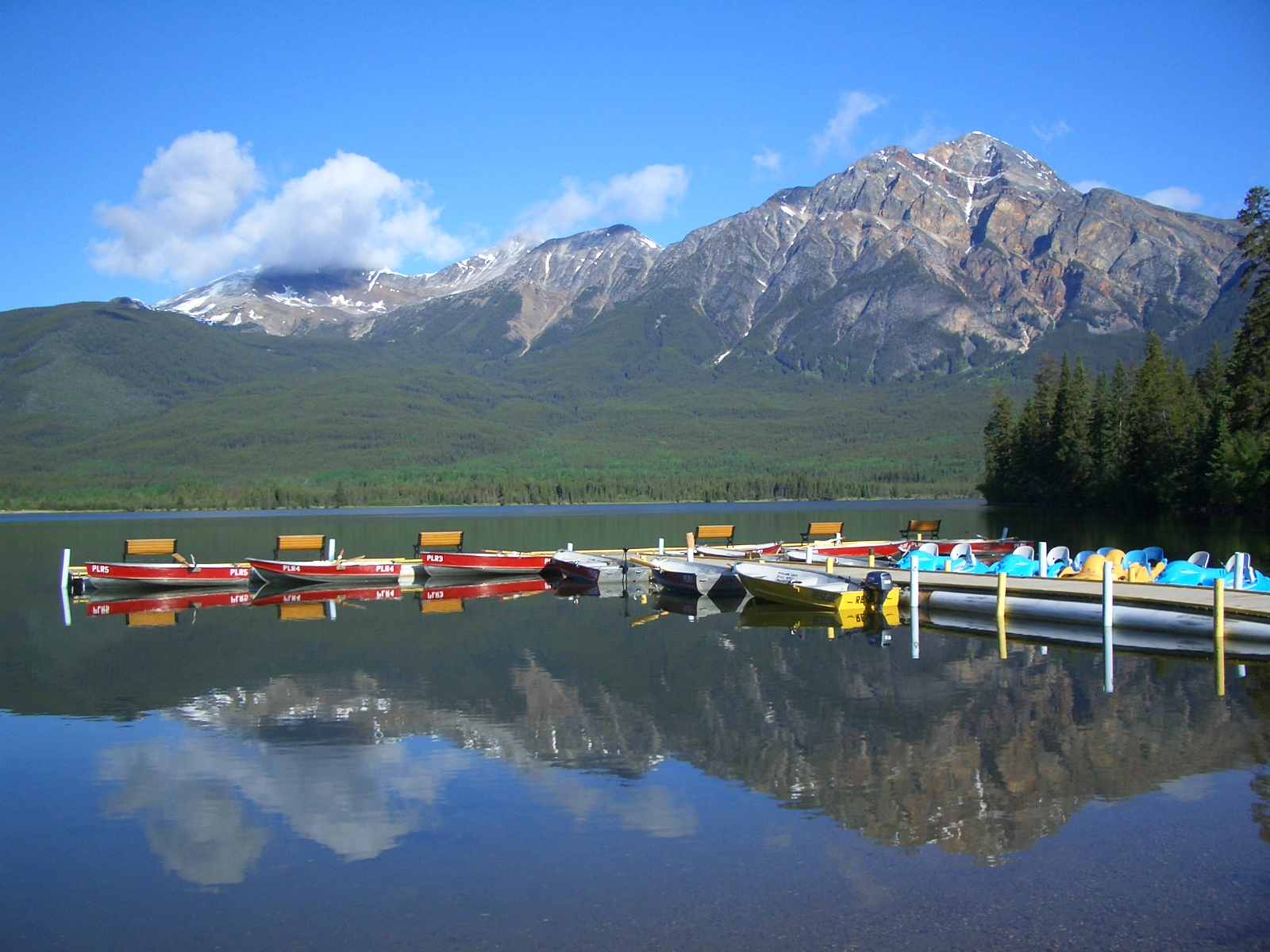
Kayaking provided by a lakeside resort in Jasper, Alberta

A resort (in North American English) is a self-contained commercial establishment that aims to provide most of a vacationer's needs on the premises. Services include food, drink, accommodation, sports, entertainment and shopping. A hotel is frequently a central feature of a resort and the term resort may be used for a hotel that provides an array of entertainment and recreational activities.

Some resorts are also condominium complexes that offer timeshares or fractional ownership, in addition to wholly owned condominiums. A resort is not always a commercial establishment operated by a single company, but in the late 20th century, this type became more common.

In British English, "resort" means a town that people visit for holidays and day trips, typically containing hotels where holidaymakers stay. Blackpool and Brighton in the UK and Ayia Napa in Cyprus are examples.

== Destination resort ==
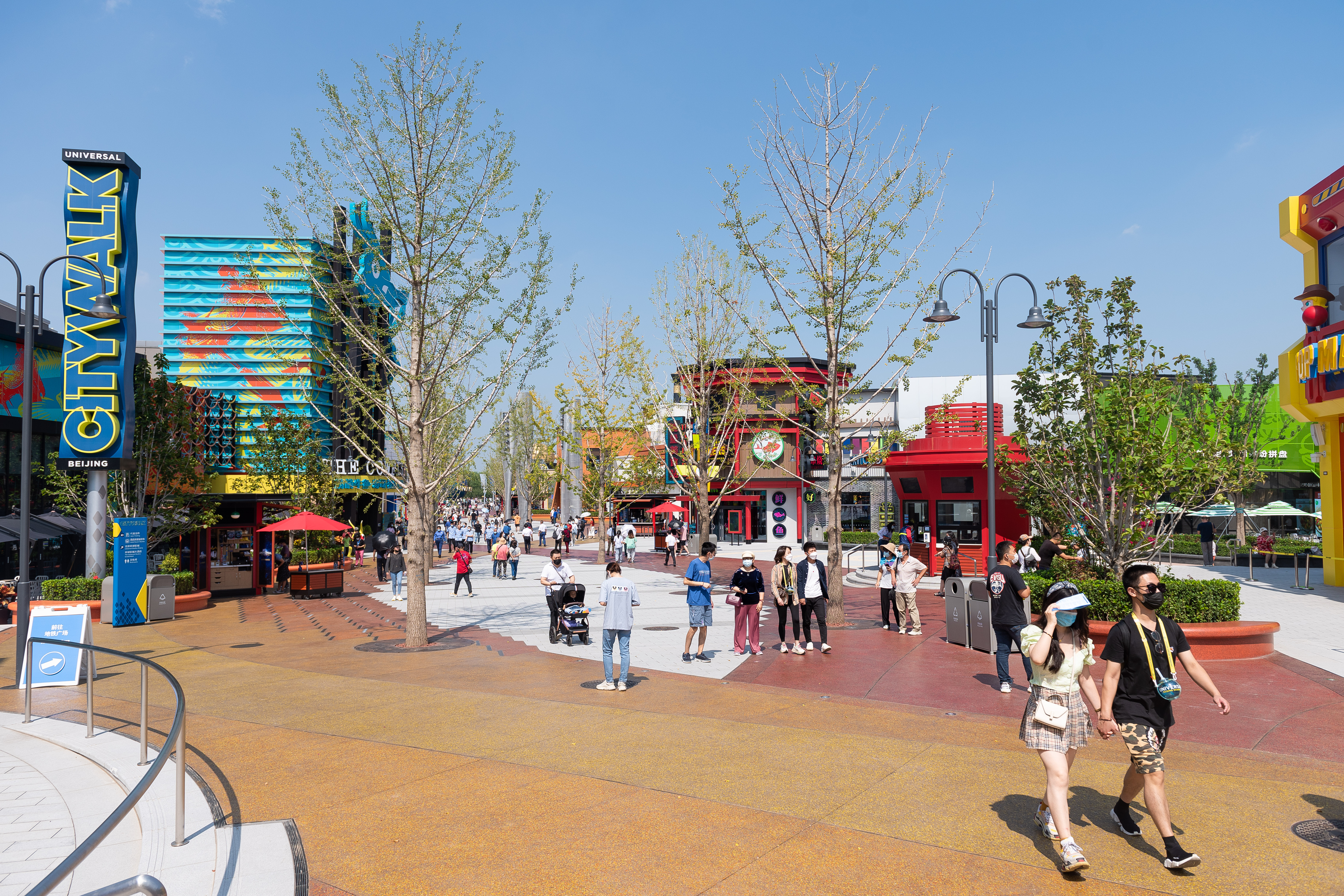
Universal Beijing Resort

A destination resort has the necessary guest attraction capabilities itself, so it does not need to be near a destination such as a town, historic site, or theme park, to attract its patrons. A commercial establishment at a destination resort, such as a recreational area, a scenic or historic site, amusement park, a gaming facility, or other tourist attraction may compete for customers.

A destination resort offers food, drink, lodging, sports, entertainment, and shopping within the facility, so that guests have no need to leave the facility throughout their stay. Commonly, the facilities are of higher quality than would be expected, if one were to stay at a hotel or eat in a town's restaurants.

Closely related are convention hotels and large meeting sites. Generally, these resorts are located in cities where they offer special meeting halls, ample accommodations, and a variety of dining and entertainment options.

== All-inclusive resort ==
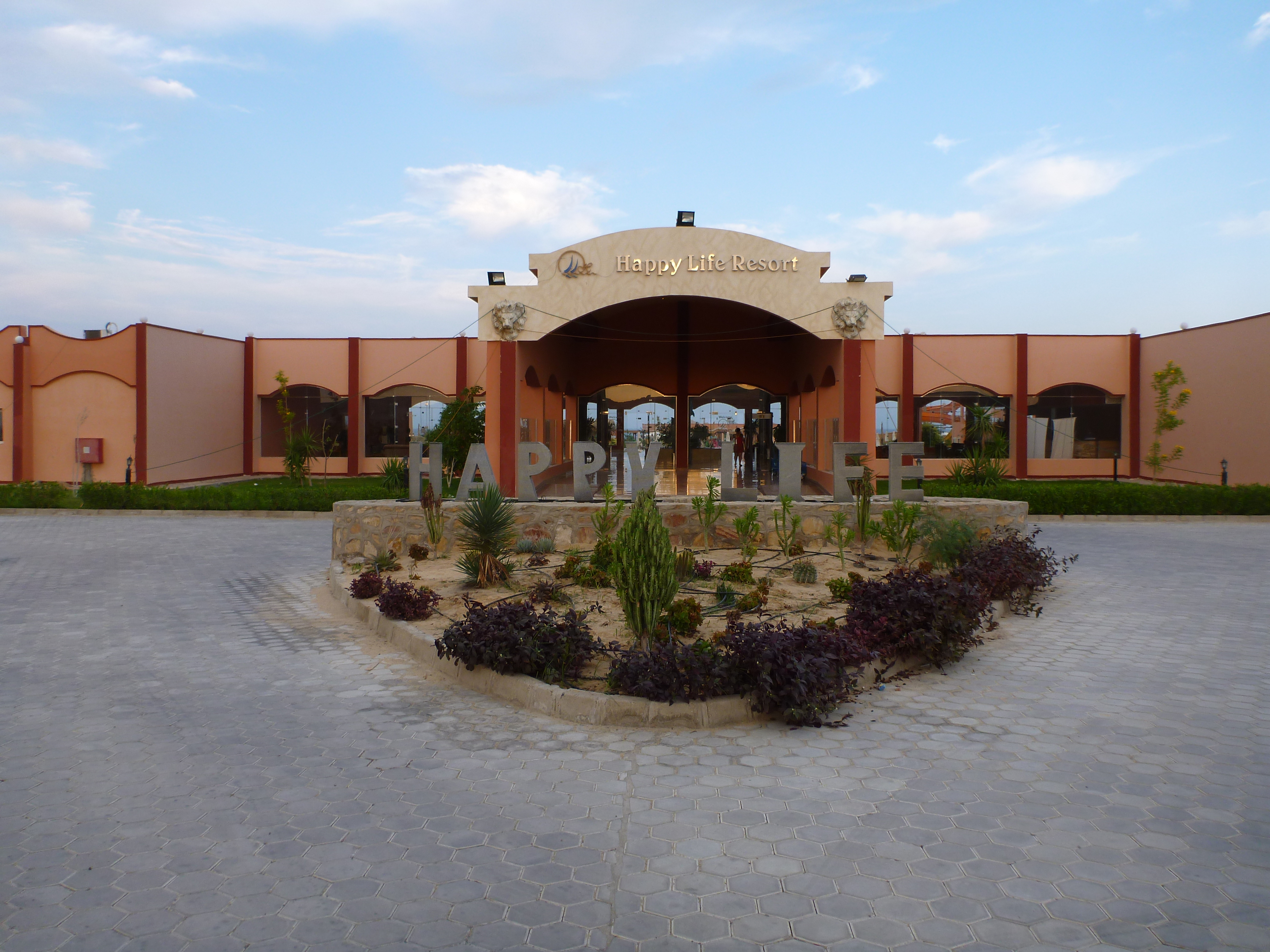
Entrance of an all-inclusive resort in Egypt

An all-inclusive resort charges a fixed price that includes most or all items. At a minimum, most inclusive resorts include lodging, unlimited food, drink, sports activities, and entertainment. In recent years, the number of resorts in the United States offering "all-inclusive" amenities has decreased dramatically. In 1961, over half offered such plans, but in 2007, less than a tenth do so.

All-inclusive resorts are found around the world, but tend to be located in warmer regions. Notable examples are Club Med, Sandals Resorts, and Beaches Resorts.

An all-inclusive resort includes three meals daily, soft drinks, most alcoholic drinks, gratuities, and usually other services in the price. Many also include offered sports and other activities in the price. The all-inclusive model originated in the Club Med resorts, which were founded by the Belgian Gérard Blitz.

Some all-inclusive resorts are designed for specific groups. For example, some cater for adults only, and even more-specialized properties are restricted to couples. Others are geared toward families, with facilities like craft centers, game rooms, and water parks to keep children of all ages entertained. All-inclusive resorts are also very popular locations for destination weddings.

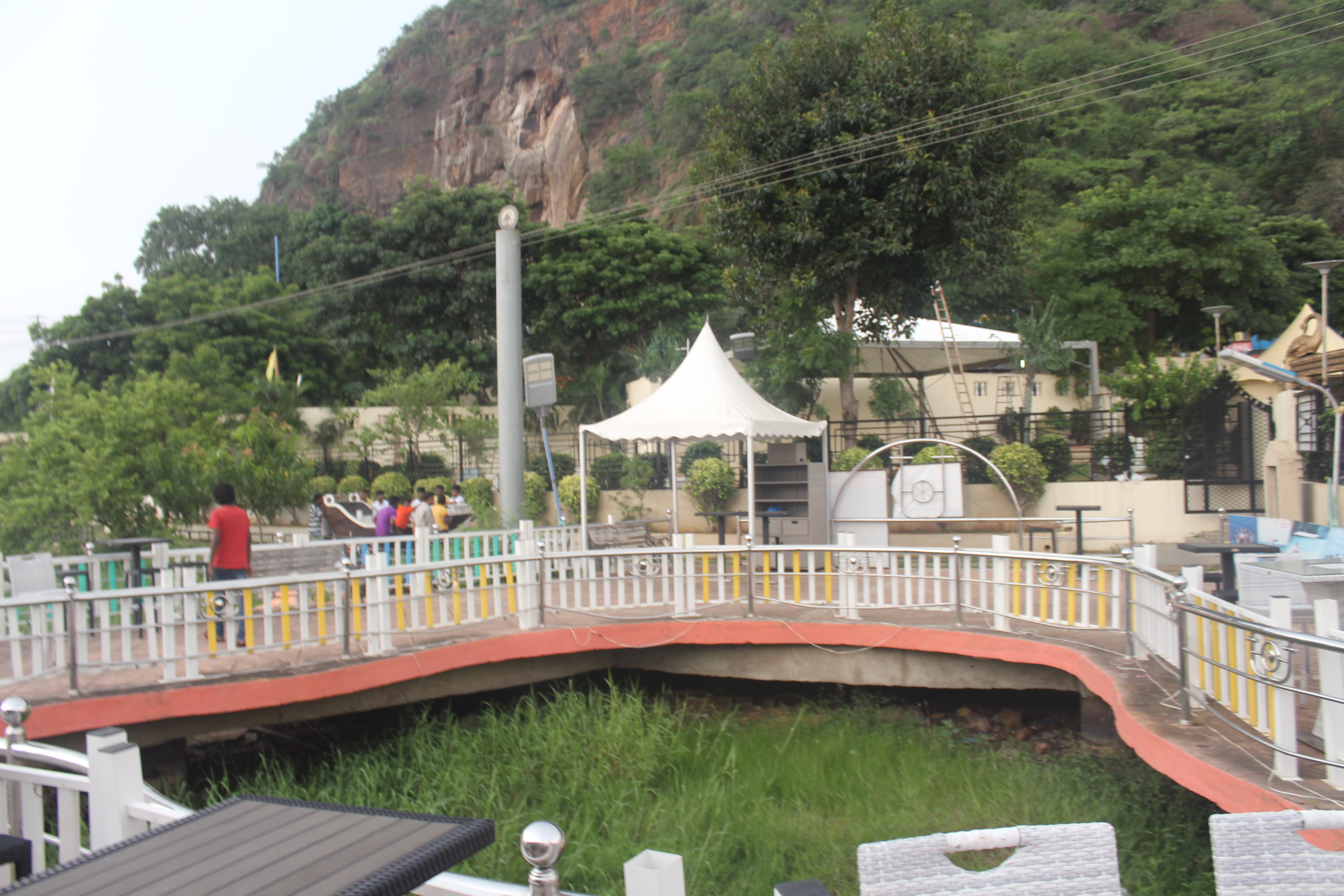
Boating resort in Vijayawada, India

== Recreation resort ==
A spa resort is a short-term residential facility primarily providing individual services for spa goers. Historically, many such spas were developed at natural hot springs or sources of mineral waters. Such facilities provide a comprehensive program that includes spa services, physical fitness activities, healthy diet programs, and special interest programming.

Golf resorts cater specifically to the sport of golf, and include access to one or more golf courses or clubhouses, typically providing packages that give visitors access to all greens and include cart fees, range balls, accommodation, and meals.

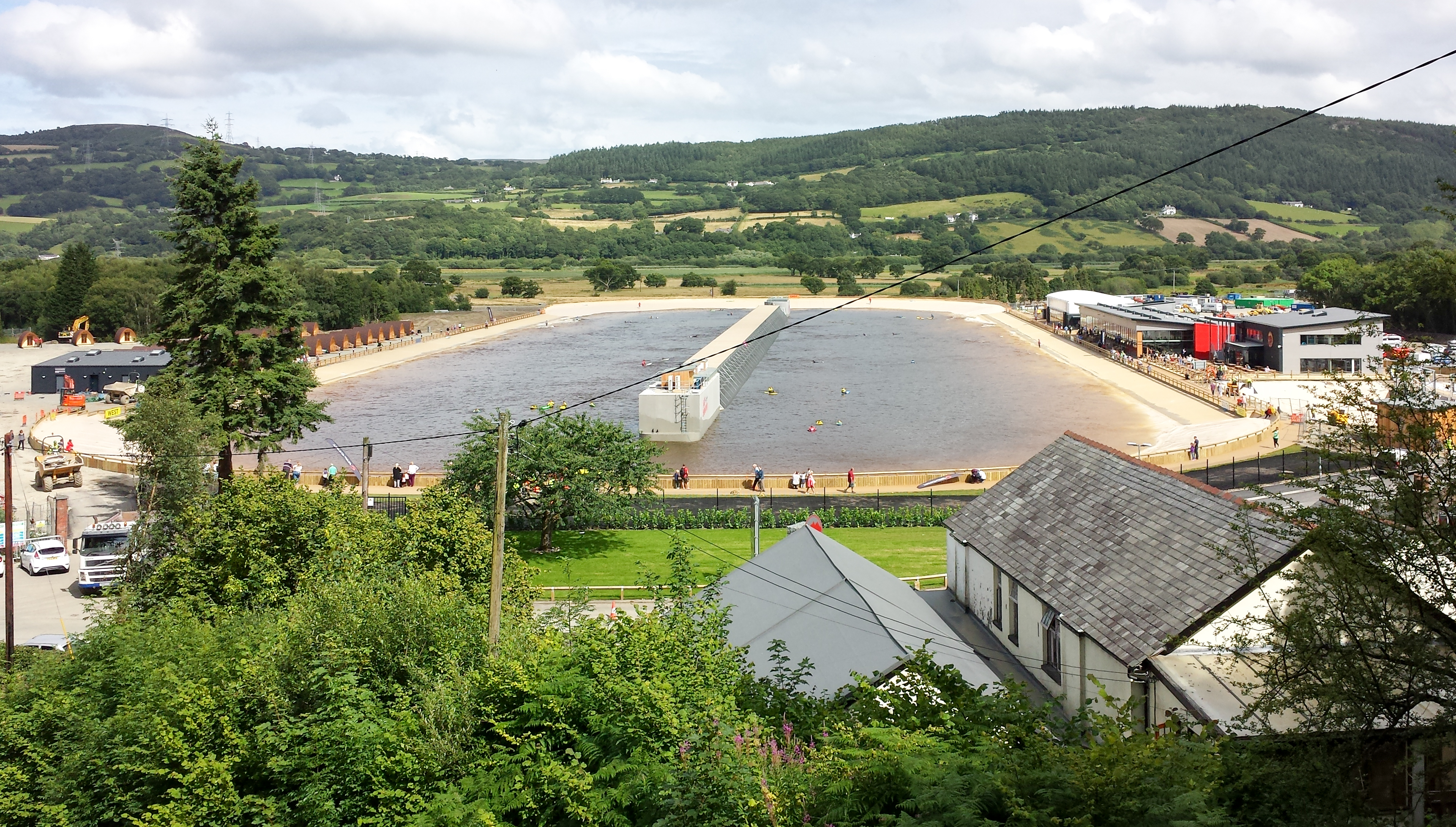
Surf Snowdonia resort in Wales

Surf resorts are a new trend, based around artificial surfing facilities with purpose-built amenities and accommodation catering to the surfing community.

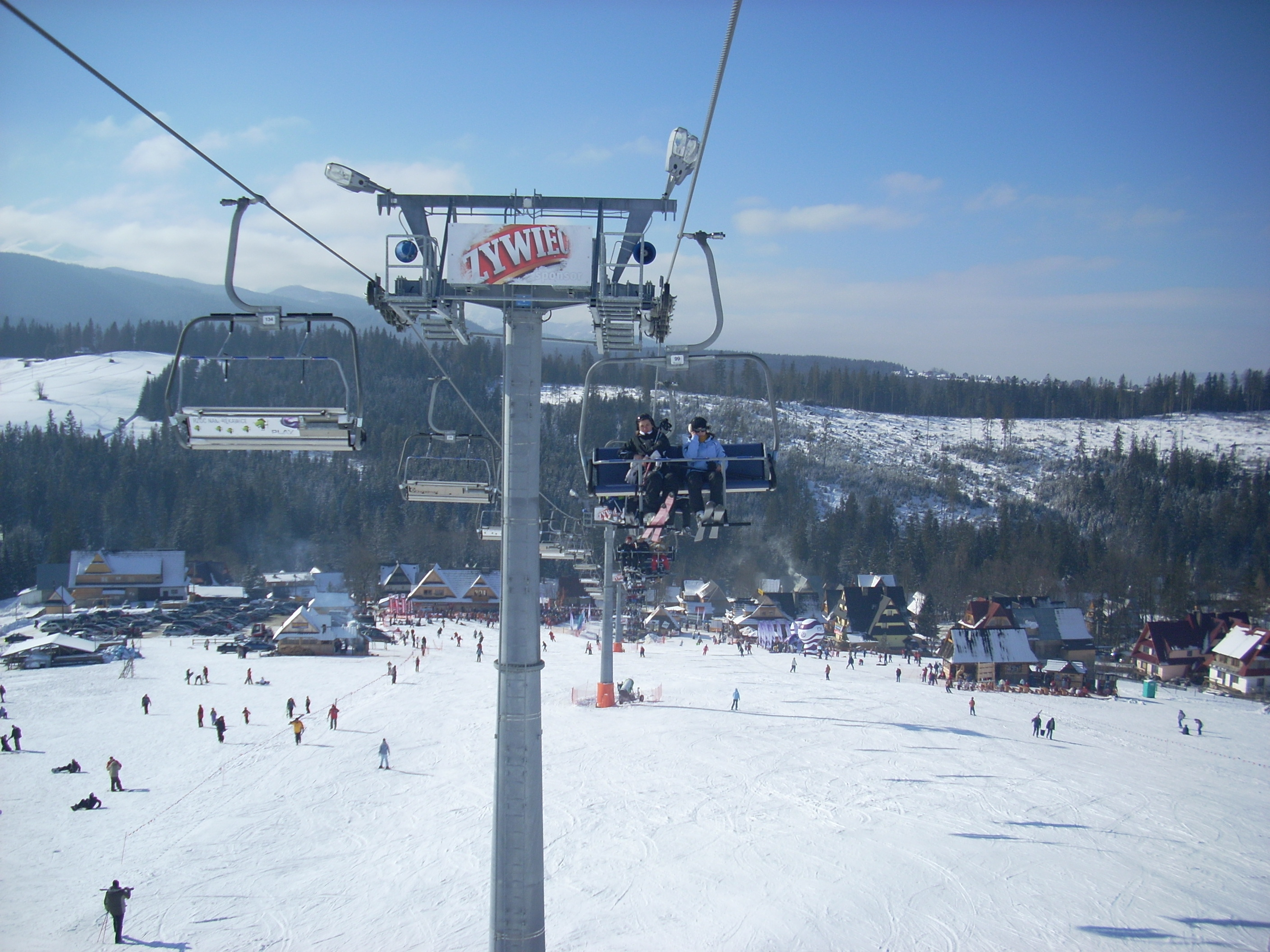
A typical ski resort

In North America, a ski resort is generally a destination resort in a ski area. The term is less likely to refer to a town or village.

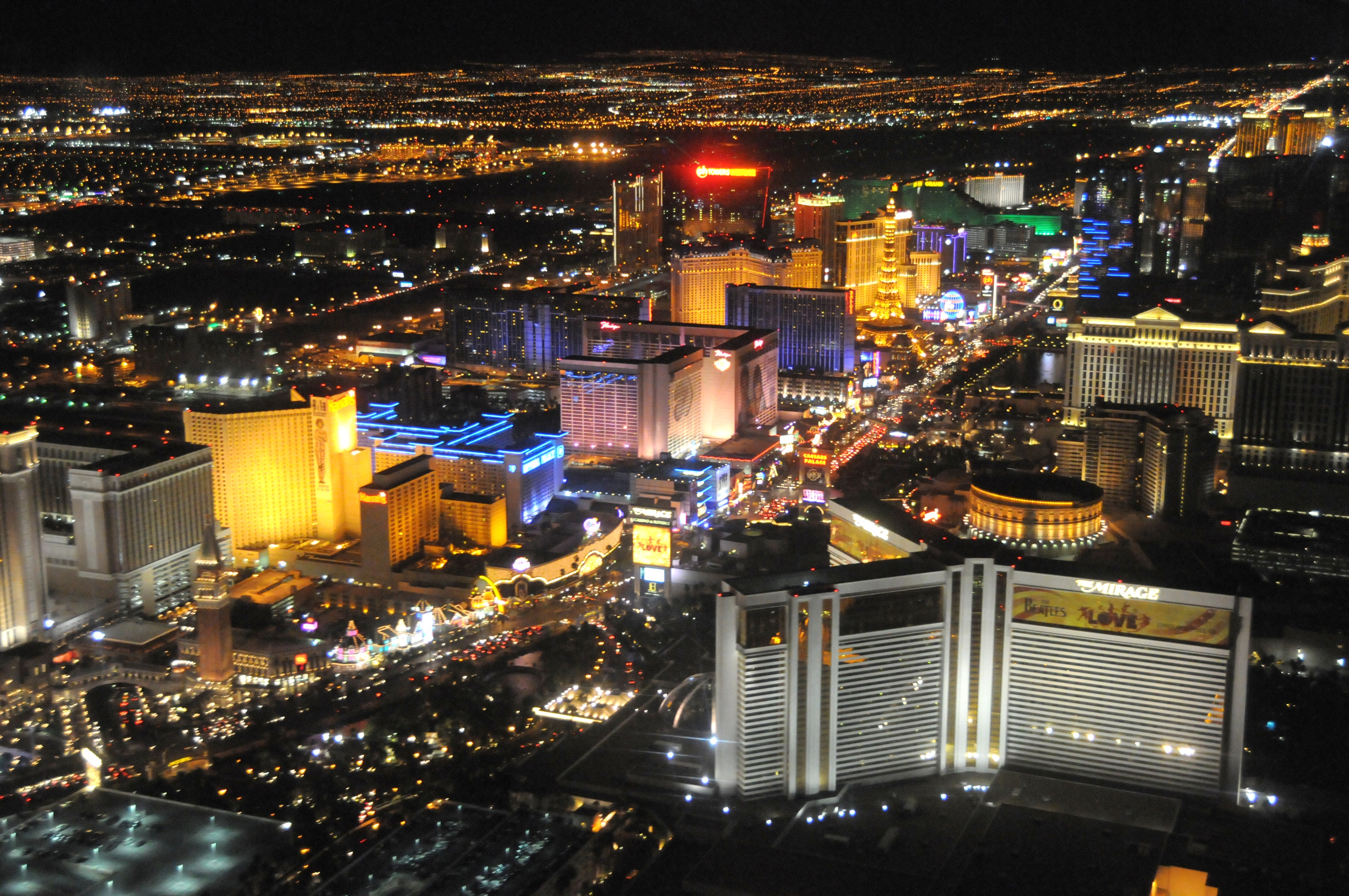
The Las Vegas Strip in 2009

A megaresort is a type of destination resort of an exceptionally large size, such as those along the Las Vegas Strip. In Singapore, integrated resort is a euphemism for a casino-based destination resort.

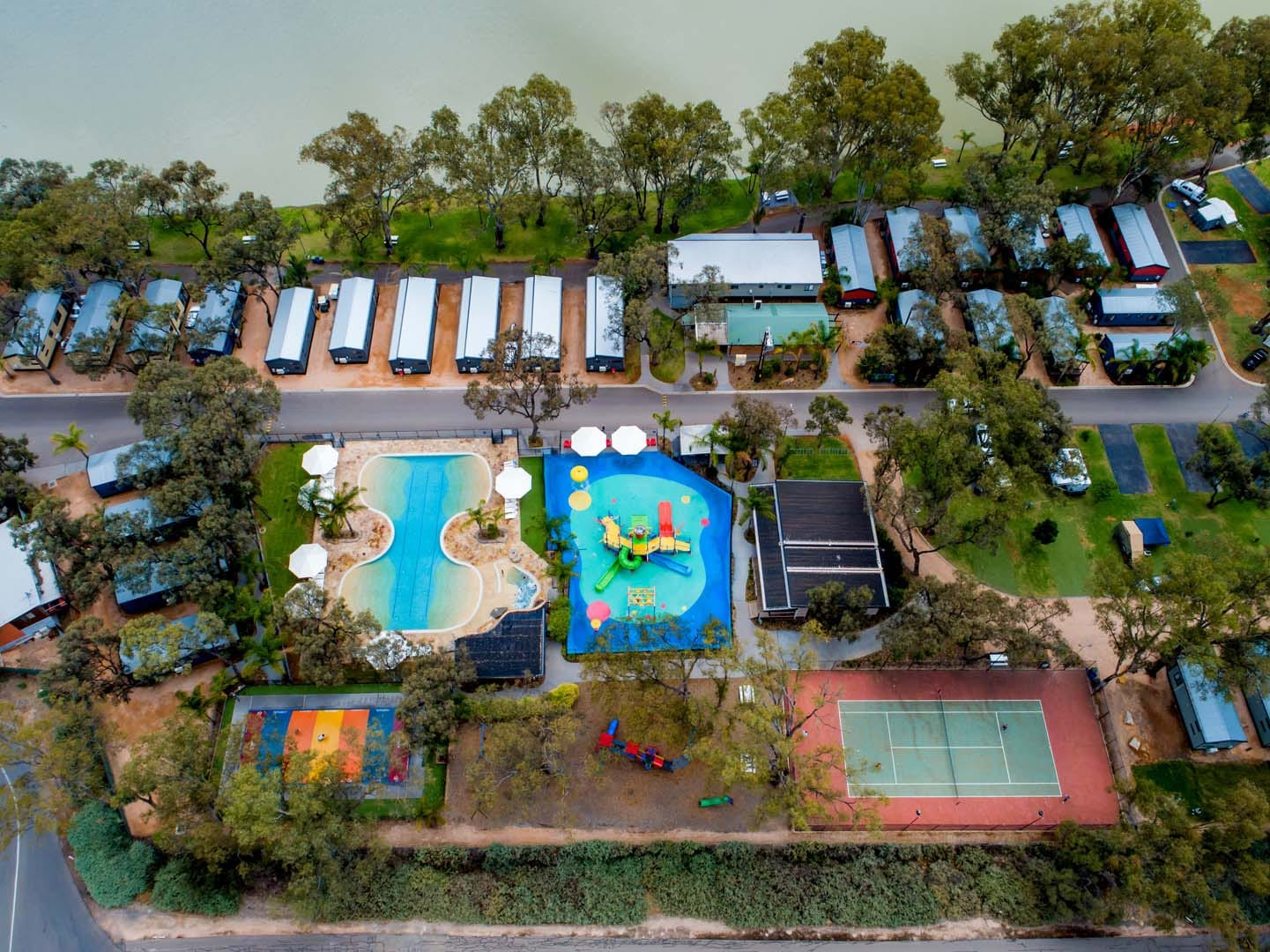
Renmark Holiday park, Australia

A holiday village is a type of self-contained resort in Europe whose accommodation is generally in villas. A holiday camp, in the United Kingdom, refers to a resort whose accommodation is in chalets or static caravans.

A resort hotel contains full-sized luxury facilities with full-service accommodations and amenities. These hotels may attract vacationing tourists and offer more than a convenient place to stay.

== Timeshare resort ==
There are more than 1500 timeshare resorts in the United States. They represent 198,000 residences and nearly 9 million owners, who pay an average $880 per year in maintenance fees. A reported 16% of the residences became vacation rentals.

== Notable historic resorts ==
- Baiae, Italy, a famous historic resort of the ancient world that was popular over 2000 years ago.
- Capri, an island near Naples, Italy, has attracted visitors since Roman times.
- Monte Ne, near Rogers, Arkansas, a famous historic resort active in the early 20th century. At its peak, more than 10,000 people a year visited. Two of its hotels, Missouri Row and Oklahoma Row, were the largest log buildings in the world. Monte Ne closed in the 1930s and was ultimately submerged in Beaver Lake in the 1960s.
- Tawawa House, also known as Tawawa Springs or Xenia Springs, inspired Dolen Perkins-Valdez to write her debut novel, Wench (2010), when she read about it in an autobiography of W.E.B. Du Bois. The book mentioned in passing that the land for Wilberforce University had once been used for a privately owned resort called Tawawa House, where white slave owners would bring the black slaves that they kept as mistresses.

== Resort towns ==
Towns that are resorts, or in which tourism or vacationing is a major part of the local activity, are sometimes called resort towns. If by the sea, they are called seaside resorts. Inland resorts include ski resorts, mountain resorts and spa towns. Well-known resort towns include Punta Cana in the Dominican Republic, Bandipur in Nepal, Bali in Indonesia, Sochi in Russia, Mount Lebanon in Lebanon, Barizo in Spain, Cortina d'Ampezzo in Italy, Druskininkai in Lithuania, Cartagena de Indias in Colombia, Cancún in Mexico, Newport, Rhode Island, and Key West, Florida, in the United States, Ischgl in Austria, St. Moritz in Switzerland and Blackpool in the United Kingdom.

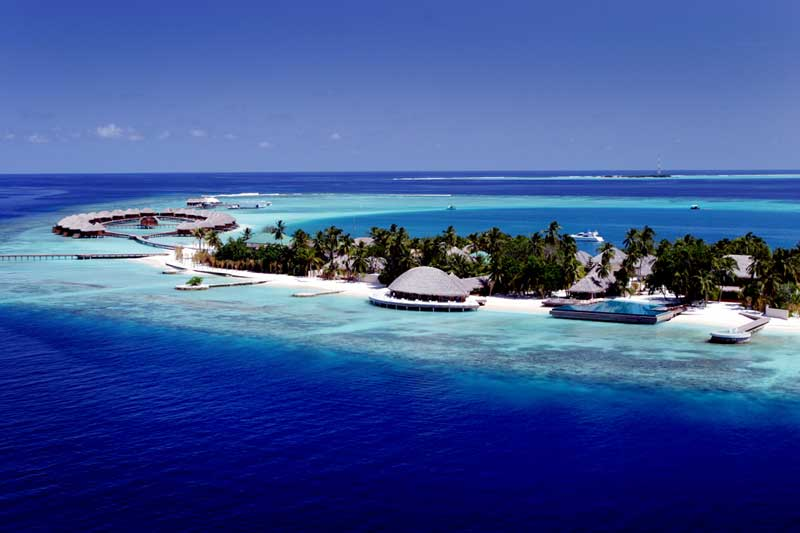
A resort island in the Maldives

A resort island is an island or an archipelago that contains resorts, hotels, restaurants, tourist attractions, and its amenities.

Seaside resorts are located on a coast. In the United Kingdom, many seaside towns have turned to other entertainment industries. The cinemas and theatres often remain to become host to a number of pubs, bars, restaurants, and nightclubs. Most of their entertainment facilities cater for both locals and visitors and the beaches still remain popular during the summer months.

In Europe and North America, ski resorts are towns and villages in ski areas, with support services for skiing such as hotels and chalets, equipment rental, ski schools and ski lifts to access the slopes.

Resorts for different purposes also exist. An example is Yulara, Northern Territory, which exists to serve Uluru (Ayers Rock) and Kata Tjuta (The Olgas) in Australia.

== See also ==
- Boutique hotel
- Condo hotel
- Destination club
- Resort architecture
- Sanatorium (resort)
