= Caeli =

Caeli may refer to:

== Astronomy ==
- Stars in the constellation Caelum, including:
  - Alpha Caeli
  - Beta Caeli

== Music ==
- Caeli enarrant..., the name of a large-scale cycle of musical works by composer Georges Lentz

== Religion ==
- Ad Caeli Reginam, an encyclical of Pope Pius XII in 1954
- Rorate caeli, the opening words of the Book of Isaiah, 45:8, in the Vulgate, is a text used in the Catholic liturgy
- "Regina caeli", an ancient Latin marian hymn of the Christian Church

== See also ==
- Includes other stars in the constellation Caelum
- Caelis, restaurant in Spain
