= ABAC =

ABAC or Abac may refer to:

- Àbac, a restaurant in Barcelona, Spain
- Abraham Baldwin Agricultural College, a public college in Tifton, Georgia
- Anti-bribery/anti-corruption solutions; see Foreign Corrupt Practices Act § Anti-bribery/anti-corruption (ABAC) solutions
- Assumption University (Thailand), formerly known as Assumption Business Administration College
- Attribute-based access control
