= Dos Cielos =

Coordinates: 41.4063°N 2.2006°E

- Interactive map of Dos Cielos

Restaurant information
- Established: 2008
- Closed: 2018
- Previous owners: Sergio & Javier Torres
- Food type: Spanish
- Location: Barcelona, Spain

Dos Cielos was a Michelin starred restaurant in Barcelona, Catalonia, Spain. It closed in 2018 so the owners could open Cocina Hermanos Torres.
