= Cinc Sentits =

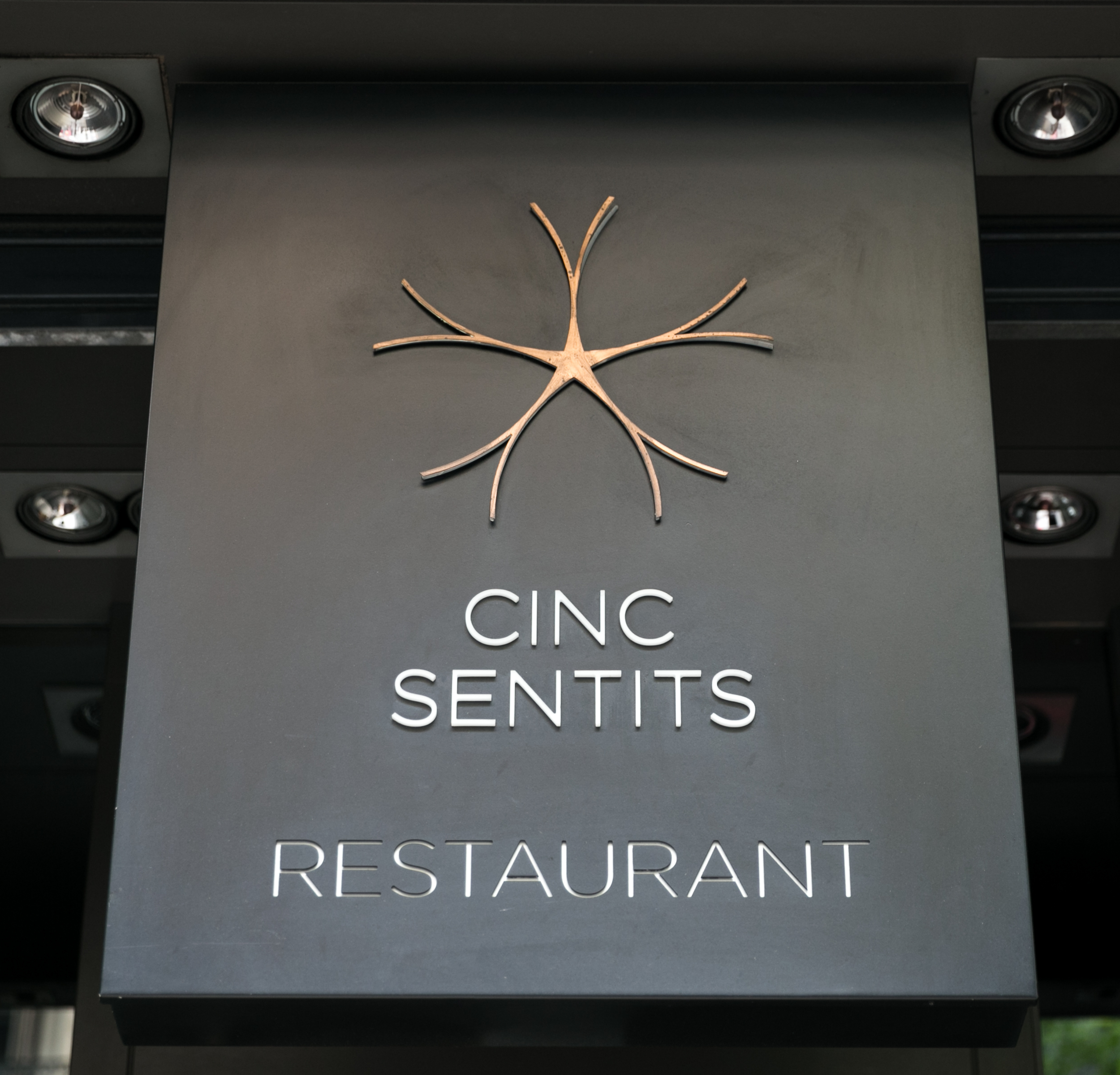
- Interactive map of Cinc Sentits

Restaurant information
- Established: 2004
- Chef: Jordi Artal
- Food type: Contemporary Catalan
- Rating: (Michelin Guide)
- Location: Entença 60, Barcelona, Catalonia, 08015, Spain
- Seating capacity: 28
- Website: https://cincsentits.com

Cinc Sentits is a Michelin two-starred restaurant in Barcelona, Catalonia, Spain run by self-taught Chef-Owner Jordi Artal and Maître-Owner Amèlia Artal. The restaurant's name reflects its goal of stimulating each of the five taste sensations: sweetness, bitterness, sourness, saltiness and umami.

== Specialties ==
The restaurant's specialties are:

- Cured and seared mackerel
- Sea Bass, Smoked Sauce, Crispy Onion and Zucchini Noodles
- Sangria without sangria

== See also ==
- Catalan cuisine
- List of Michelin-starred restaurants in Barcelona
