= Moments (restaurant) =

Coordinates: 41.391219°N 2.166611°E

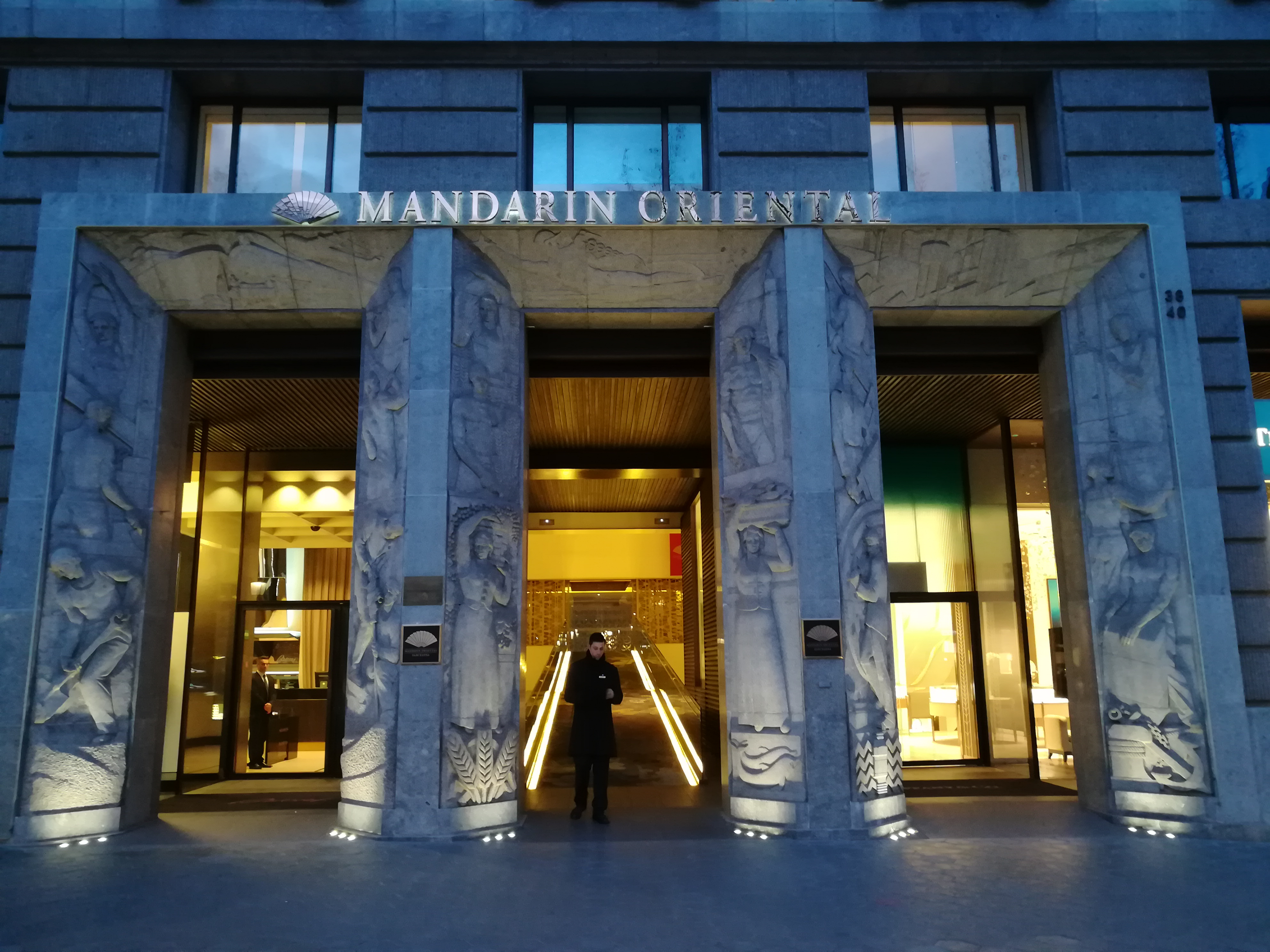
- Interactive map of Moments

Restaurant information
- Location: Baecelona, Spain

Moments is a Michelin starred restaurant in Barcelona, Spain.

== See also ==
- List of Michelin-starred restaurants in Barcelona
