= Alkimia =

Coordinates: 41.3827°N 2.1633°E

- Interactive map of Alkimia

Restaurant information
- Location: Barcelona, Spain

Alkimia is a Michelin starred restaurant in Barcelona, Spain.

== See also ==
- List of Michelin-starred restaurants in Barcelona
