= Hofmann (restaurant) =

- Interactive map of Hofmann

Restaurant information
- Location: Barcelona, Spain
- Coordinates: 41°23′50″N 2°09′11″E

Hofmann is a Michelin starred restaurant in Barcelona, Spain.

== See also ==
- List of Michelin-starred restaurants in Barcelona
