= Saüc =

Spanish restaurant

Coordinates: 41°23′13.11″N 2°10′27.36″E

- Interactive map of Saüc

Restaurant information
- Established: 2002
- Closed: 2016
- Chef: Xavier Franco
- Food type: Catalan
- Location: Vía Laietana, 49, Barcelona, Spain

Saüc was a Michelin starred restaurant in Barcelona, Spain.
