= Cocina Hermanos Torres =

Restaurant in Barcelona, Spain

- Interactive map of Cocina Hermanos Torres

Restaurant information
- Established: 2018
- Head chef: Sergio & Javier Torres
- Food type: Mediterranean
- Rating: 3 Michelin stars 1 Michelin green star
- Location: Taquígraf Serra 20, Barcelona, 08029, Spain
- Coordinates: 41°23′11.5″N 2°8′24.1″E
- Website: cocinahermanostorres.com

Cocina Hermanos Torres is a restaurant in Barcelona, Catalonia, Spain with three Michelin stars.

== See also ==
- List of Michelin-starred restaurants in Spain
