= Gaig =

- Interactive map of Gaig

Restaurant information
- Established: 1989
- Owners: Carles Gaig, Fina Navarro
- Head chef: Daniel Alonso
- Food type: Catalan
- Location: Carrer de la Nau Santa Maria, 5, Les Corts, Barcelona, 08017, Spain
- Coordinates: 41.39174°N 2.13183°E
- Other locations: Yes
- Website: restaurantgaig.com

Gaig is a Spanish restaurant chain founded in 1989 by chef Carles Gaig. In 1993, it obtained a Michelin star.

== History ==
The restaurant, specializing in Catalan cuisine, was opened by chef Carles Gaig in 1989. Four years later it was awarded a Michelin star. In 1999, Gaig received the award for Best Chef from the Royal Spanish Academy of Gastronomy. In 2004, the restaurant moved to the Ensanche district in Barcelona and that same year it was awarded as the restaurant of the year by the Catalan Academy of Gastronomy.

In 2008, a new establishment was opened on Calle Córcega in Barcelona. Two new restaurants were established, one in Singapore and another in Barcelona with takeaway service.
