= Capritx =

Restaurant in Spain

Restaurant information
- Location: Terrassa, Spain

Capritx is a Michelin starred restaurant in Terrassa, Spain.
