= Manairó =

- Interactive map of Manairó

Restaurant information
- Food type: Catalan, Mediterranean
- Location: Barcelona, Spain

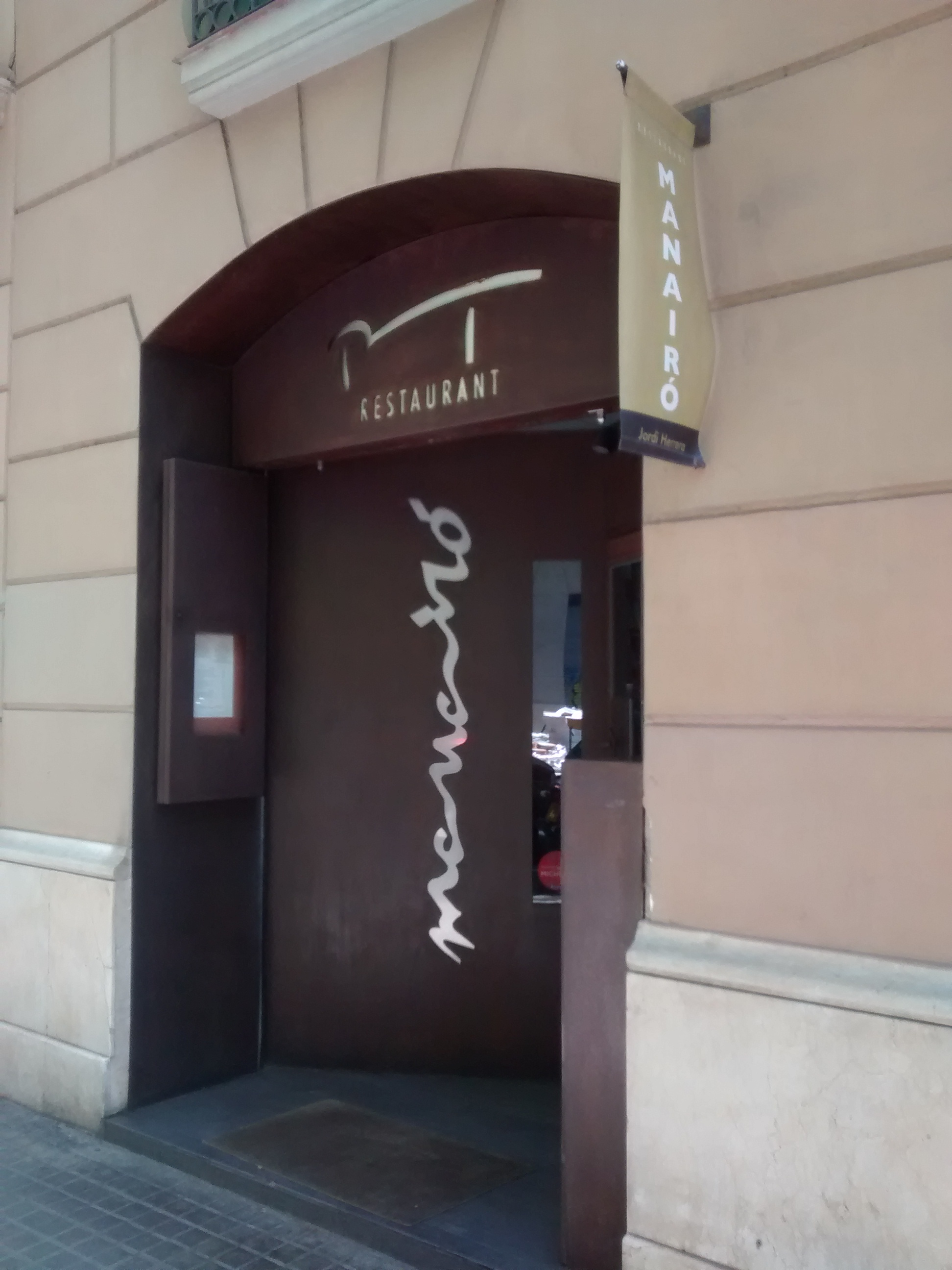
Exterior of Manairó

Manairó is a Michelin starred restaurant in Barcelona, Spain.
