= Lasarte =

- Interactive map of Lasarte

Restaurant information
- Head chef: Martín Berasategui
- Chef: Paolo Casagrande
- Rating: (Michelin Guide)
- Location: C/ Mallorca, 259, Barcelona, Catalonia, 08008, Spain
- Website: http://www.restaurantlasarte.com

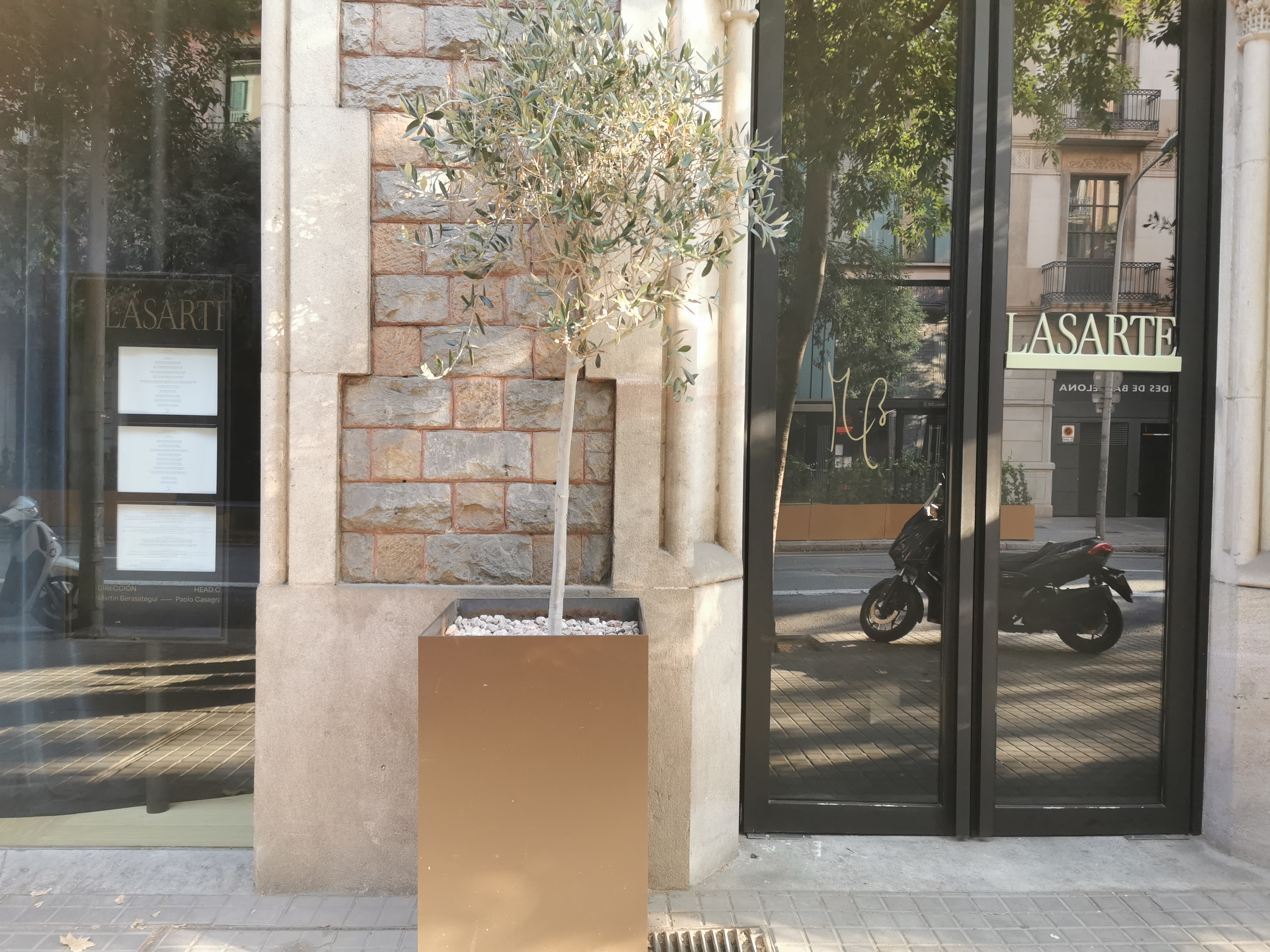
Lasarte

Restaurante Lasarte is a restaurant in Barcelona, Catalonia, Spain. It has three Michelin stars since 2016.

== See also ==
- List of Michelin-starred restaurants in Spain
