= Neichel =

Restaurant information
- Location: Barcelona, Spain

Neichel is a Michelin starred restaurant in Barcelona, Spain.
