= Comerç 24 =

Defunct restaurant in Barcelona, Spain

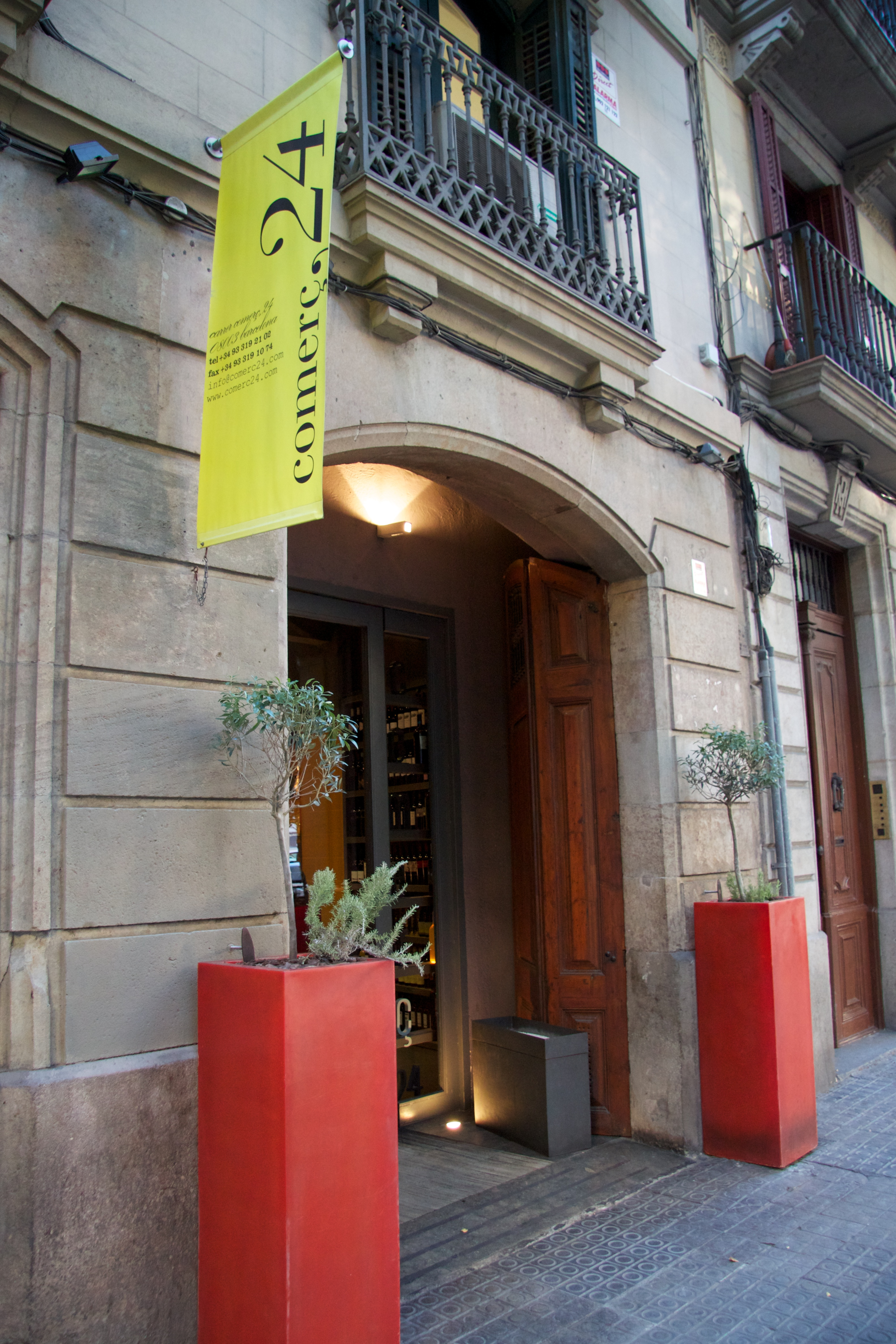
- Interactive map of Comerç 24

Restaurant information
- Closed: 2015
- Location: Barcelona, Spain

Comerç 24 was a Michelin-starred restaurant in Barcelona, Spain. It closed in 2015.
