= Hisop =

- Interactive map of Hisop

Restaurant information
- Location: Barcelona, Spain
- Coordinates: 41°23′40″N 2°08′53″E

Hisop is a Michelin starred restaurant in Barcelona, Spain.

== See also ==
- List of Michelin-starred restaurants in Barcelona
