= Enoteca (restaurant) =

Coordinates: 41.387011°N 2.196636°E

- Interactive map of Enoteca

Restaurant information
- Location: Barcelona, Spain

Enoteca is a Michelin starred restaurant in Barcelona, Spain.

== See also ==
- List of Michelin-starred restaurants in Barcelona
