= Martín Berasategui =

Spanish chef

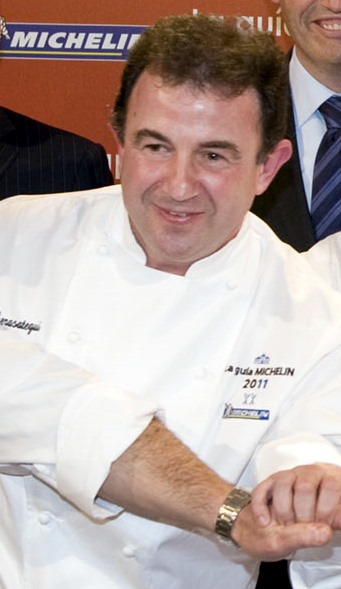
- Berasategui in 2010
- Born: Martín Berasategui Olazábal; 27 April 1960 (age 66); San Sebastián, Basque Country, Spain
- Culinary career
- Rating
- Michelin stars
- Current restaurants
- Martín Berasategui; Lasarte; M.B; Fifty Seconds; Ola Martín Berasategui
- Previous restaurants
- Etxeko; Oria; Bodegón Alejandro
- Website: www.martinberasategui.com

Martín Berasategui Olazábal is a Spanish chef, expert in Basque cuisine and owner of an eponymous restaurant in Lasarte-Oria (Gipuzkoa), Spain. Since 2001, it has been awarded three Michelin stars. He holds eleven stars in total as of 2026, more than any other Spanish chef.

== Biography ==
At the age of 14, Berasategui began to work in his parents' restaurant, Bodegón Alejandro. When Berasategui began his culinary career, there were no Michelin star restaurants in the Basque Country. He was sent to France to train as a pastry chef when he was 17. At the age of 20 he took over his parents' restaurant, and earned his first Michelin star there by the age of 25.

Berasategui opened his eponymous restaurant in Lasarte-Oria (outside San Sebastián) in 1993. It was awarded a third Michelin star in the 2001 Michelin Guide. The restaurant was voted 29th-best restaurant in the world by Restaurant in both 2008 and 2011, the highest the restaurant has appeared on the list.

As of 2013, Berasategui holds more Michelin stars than any other Spanish chef. In addition to his three at Martín Berasategui, he holds three at Lasarte in Barcelona, two at M.B in Tenerife (the largest of the Canary Islands), two at Fifty Seconds in Lisbon, Portugal, and one at Ola Martín Berasategui in Bilbao.

M.B, located in Tenerife's Ritz-Carlton Abama resort, gained its first Michelin star in the 2010 guide and its second in the 2014 guide. Fifty Seconds, Berasategui's first and only starred restaurant outside of Spain, opened atop Lisbon's Vasco de Gama Tower in 2018; it gained its first star in 2019 and its second in 2026. Ola Martín Berasategui also received its first star in 2019.

One star each were awarded to Oria, the sister restaurant of Lasarte that is also located in the Monument Hotel in Barcelona, and Etzeko in Ibiza; both restaurants are now closed. In addition to his five Michelin-starred restaurants, he owns several more around the world, including two in the Dominican Republic, one in Mexico, one in Costa Rica, and one in Dubai.

It was announced in 2013 that the François Rabelais University would be awarding an honorary doctorate to Berasategui in culinary studies. It is the first time that the university has awarded honorary doctorates to chefs, with Mikuni Kiyomi, Philippe Rochat and Pierre Wynants also receiving the awards.

== Michelin-starred restaurants associated with Martín Berasategui and their highest rating ==
Key
1 Michelin star	One Michelin star
2 Michelin stars	Two Michelin stars
3 Michelin stars	Three Michelin stars

No.	Name	Country	Rating
1	Martín Berasategui	Spain (Lasarte-Oria)	3 Michelin stars
2	Lasarte	Spain (Barcelona)	3 Michelin stars
3	M.B	Spain (Guía de Isora)	2 Michelin stars
4	Fifty Seconds	Portugal (Lisbon)	2 Michelin stars
5	Ola Martín Berasategui	Spain (Bilbao)	1 Michelin star
6	~~Etxeko~~ - closed	Spain (Ibiza)	1 Michelin star
7	~~Oria~~ - closed	Spain (Barcelona)	1 Michelin star
