= Via Veneto (restaurant) =

Coordinates: 41.3925°N 2.1392°E

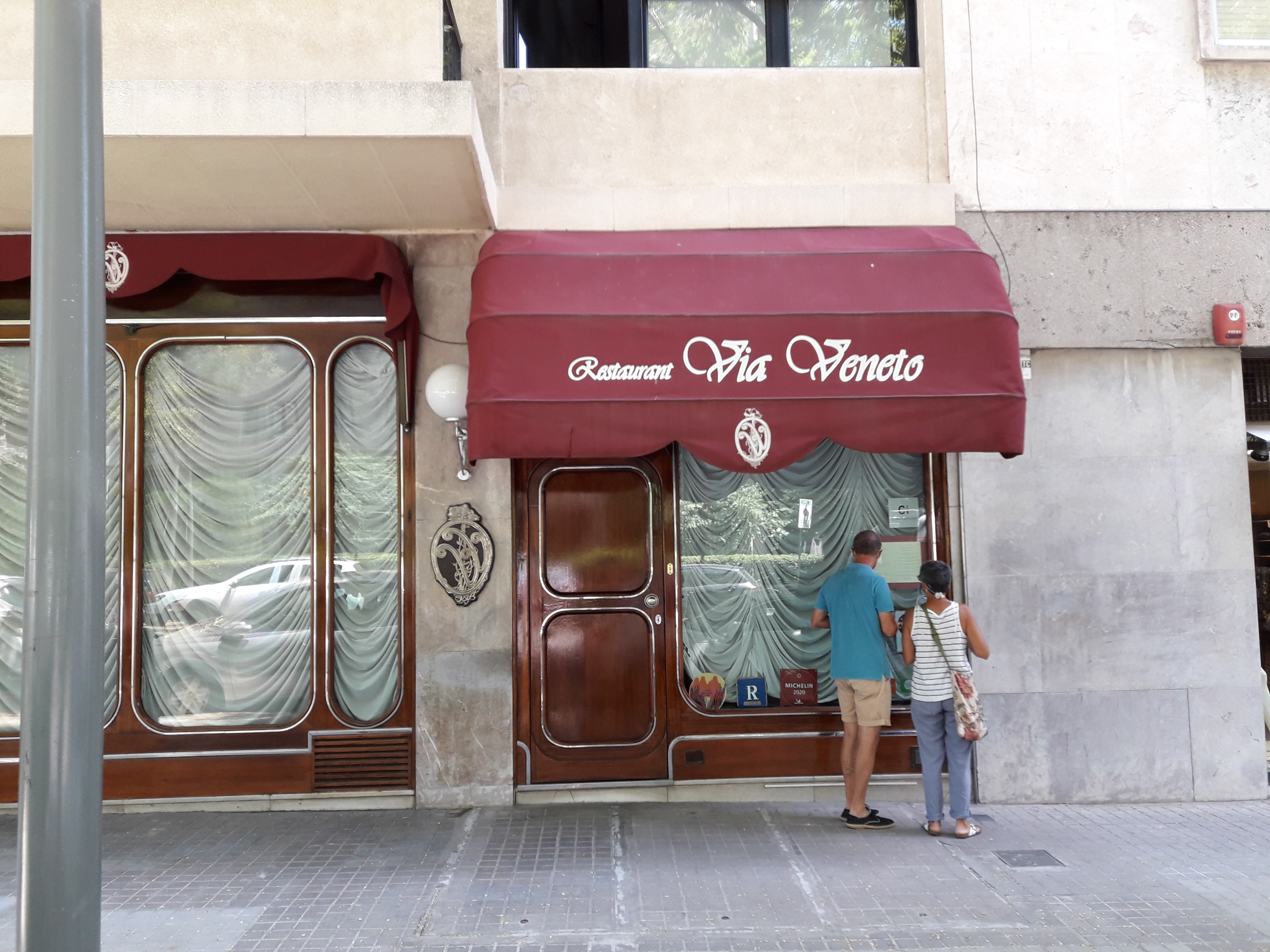
- Interactive map of Via Veneto

Restaurant information
- Established: 1967
- Head chef: David Andrés
- Rating: 1 Michelin star
- Location: Ganduxer 10, Barcelona, 08021, Spain
- Website: viavenetobarcelona.com

Via Veneto is a Michelin starred restaurant in Barcelona, Catalonia, Spain.

== See also ==
- List of Michelin-starred restaurants in Barcelona
