= Moo (restaurant) =

Coordinates: 41.39627°N 2.16097°E

- Interactive map of Moo

Restaurant information
- Location: Barcelona, Spain

Moo was a Michelin starred restaurant in Barcelona, Catalonia, Spain.
