= Caelis =

Coordinates: 41°23′13.4″N 2°10′27.6″E

- Interactive map of Caelis

Restaurant information
- Location: Barcelona, Spain

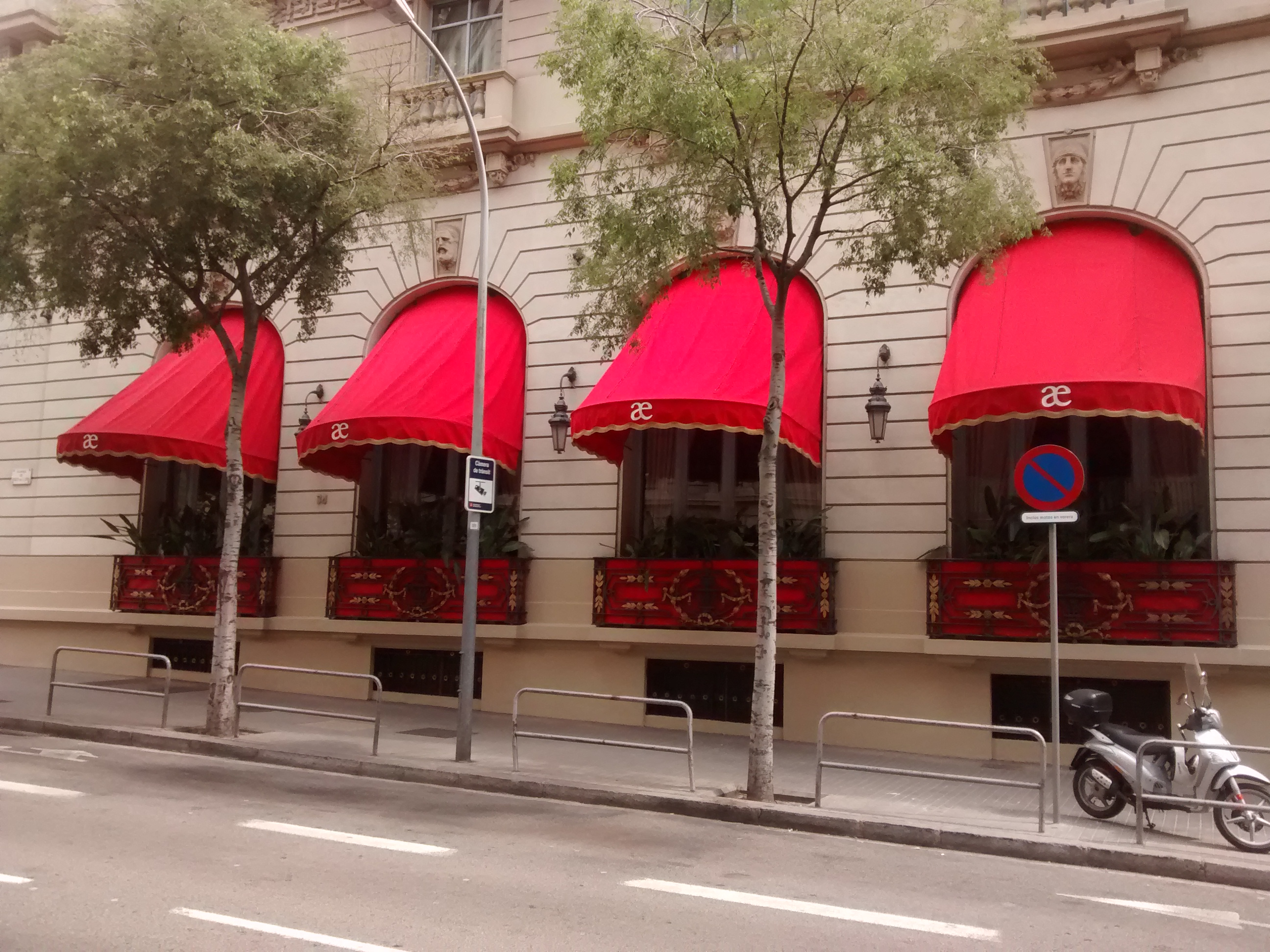
Caelis at the El Palace Hotel, pictured in 2016

Caelis is a Michelin-starred restaurant in Barcelona, Spain. In 2002, Toulouse chef Romain Fornell took over the Diana restaurant at the El Palace Hotel and renamed it Caelis in 2004. It received its Michelin star the next year. The restaurant was closed from 2009 to 2011, when the hotel underwent a major renovation. Caelis moved to the Hotel Ohla in 2017.

== See also ==
- List of Michelin-starred restaurants in Barcelona
