= Barizo =

Fishing town in Spain

Coordinates: 43.307°N 8.863°W

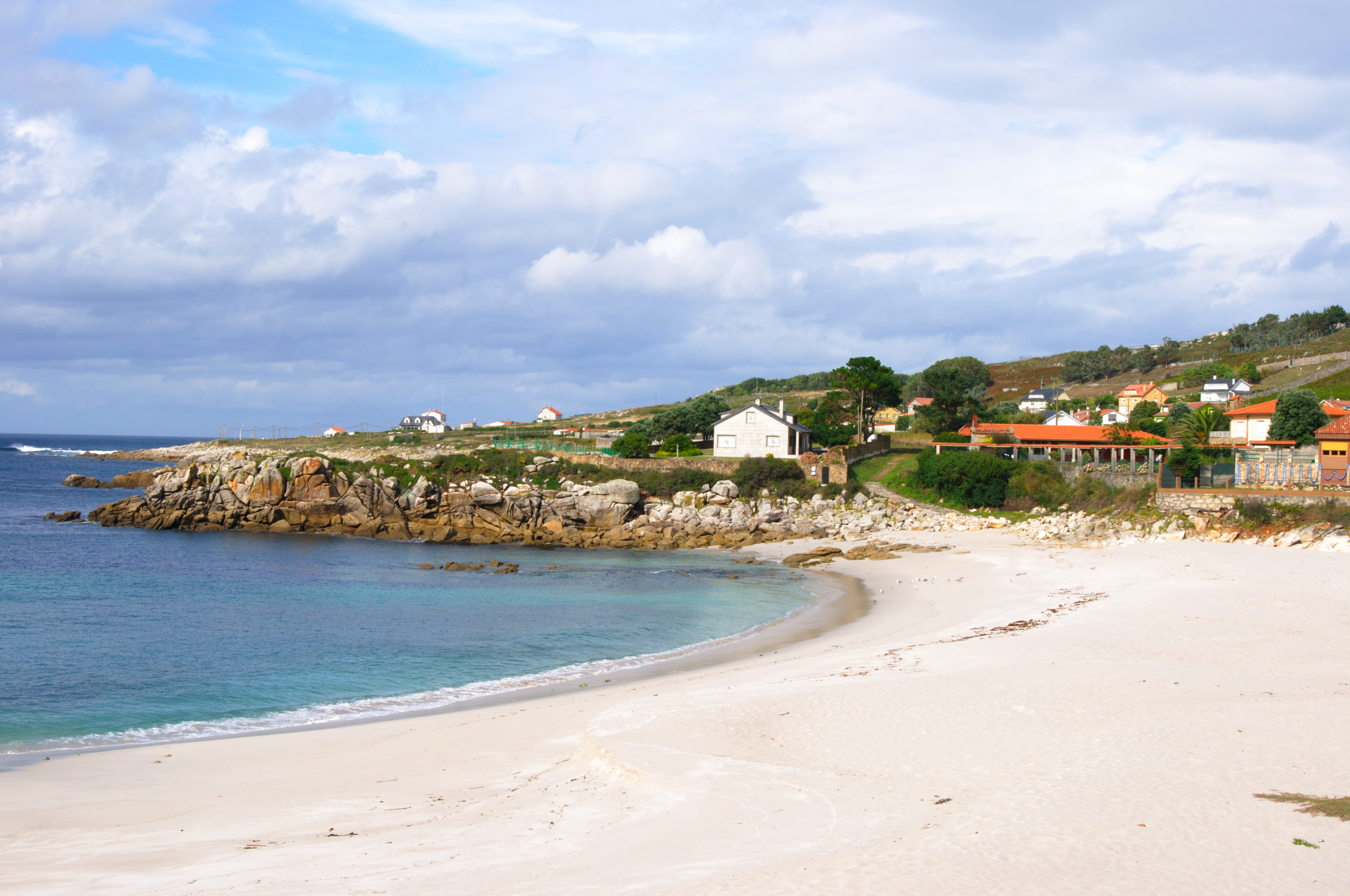
Praia de Barizo

Barizo is a fishing town in the northern part of Spain, specifically along the Costa da Morte in the province of A Coruña in the autonomous region of Galicia. The village is known for its estuarine environment and the Praia de Barizo, a quiet, U-shaped beach with fine white sand, protected by large rocks.

== Economy ==
Barizo's economy depends mostly on fishing. Conveniently located along the Costa da Morte, Barizo is also dubbed as a resort town. Accommodations in this town are mostly consisted of small hotels offering cheap rates. Barizo is also known as an estuarine site.

== Prestige Oil Spill ==
Barizo is one of the towns affected by the Prestige oil spill which happened off the Galician coast. Barizo was the most affected town according to a research study done after the Prestige oil spill. The Barizo beach suffered a high amount of Petroleum Hydrocarbon. The fishing industry also suffered a lot.

== Other necessary information ==
Galician language is widely spoken in the town.
