= Àbac =

Coordinates: 41.4108°N 2.1363°E

- Interactive map of Àbac

Restaurant information
- Location: Barcelona, Spain

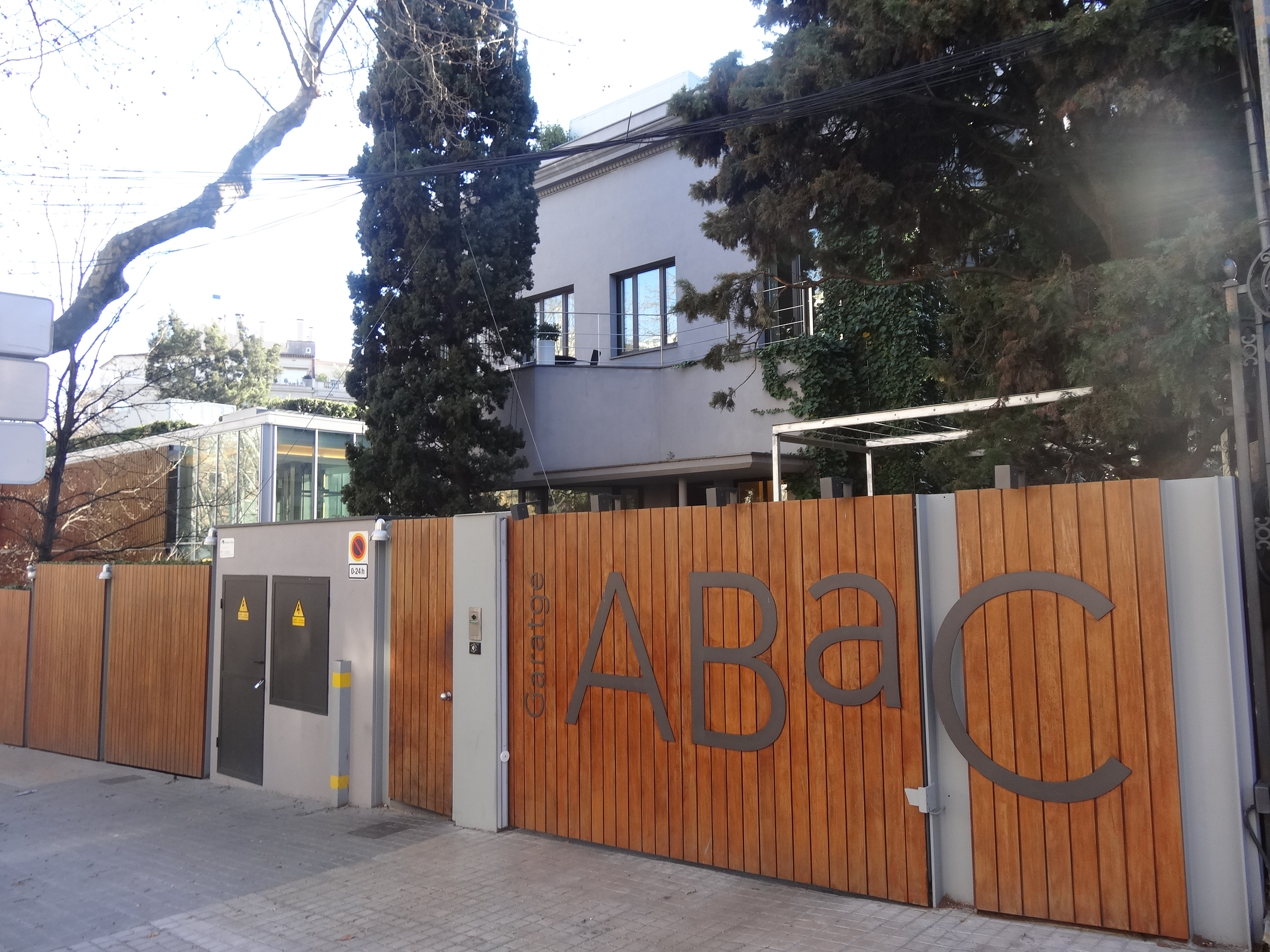
Restaurant entrance

Àbac is a Michelin-starred restaurant in Barcelona, Catalonia, Spain.

== See also ==
- List of Michelin-starred restaurants in Spain
