= Cod tongue =

Fish delicacy

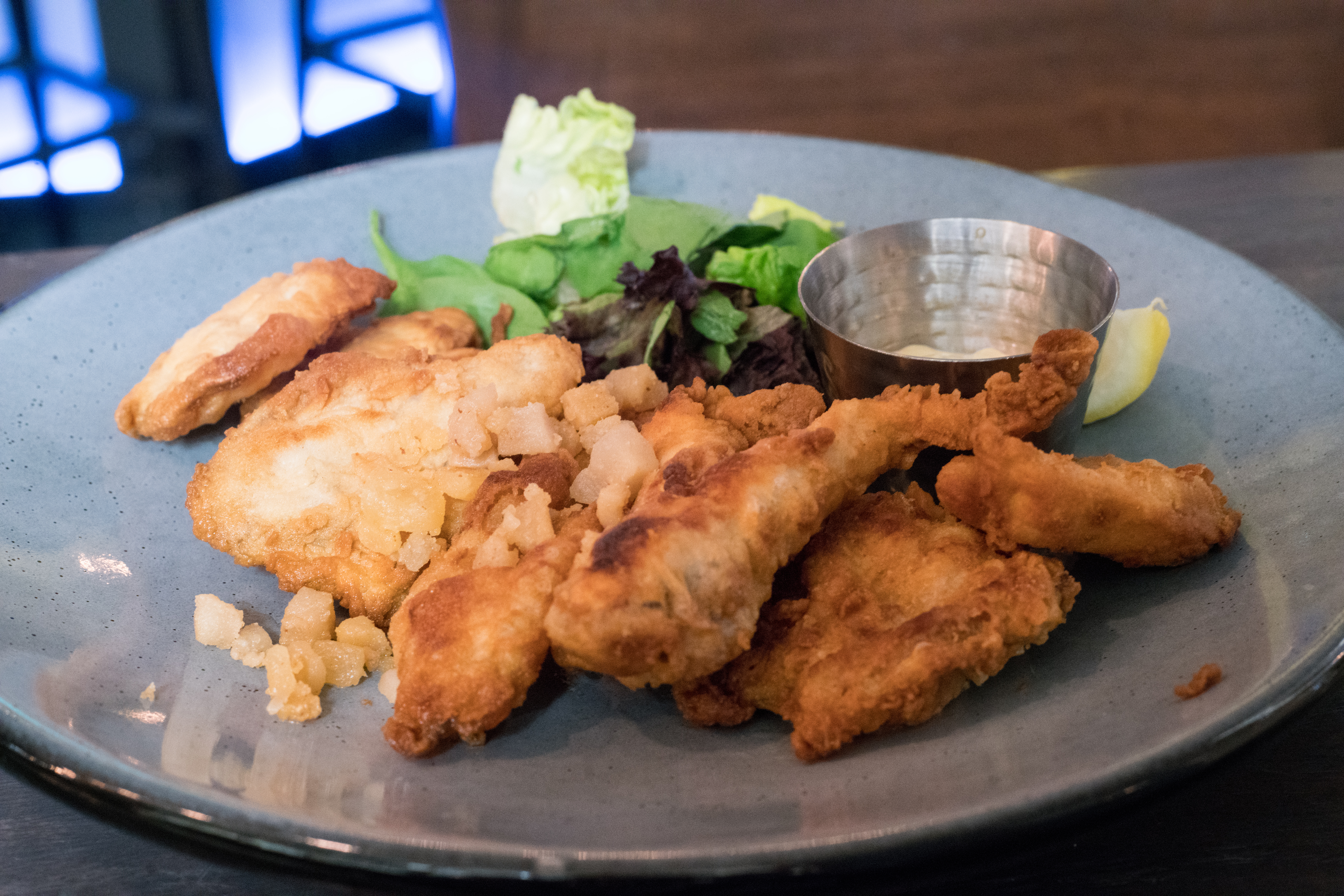
- Newfoundland cod tongue
- Type: Fish, offal
- Place of origin: Basque Country; Belgium; Canada; Faroe Islands; France; Iceland; New England; Northern Norway; Pacific Northwest; Portugal; United States
- Region or state: Cod fisheries
- Associated cuisine: Basque cuisine; Belgian cuisine; Canadian cuisine; Faroese cuisine; French cuisine; Icelandic cuisine; New England cuisine; Norwegian cuisine; Pacific Northwest cuisine; Portuguese cuisine
- Main ingredients: Cod

Cod tongue is a variety meat from codfish. Given that cod do not have a tongue nor a basihyal tooth plate, the cut actually consists of the boneless flesh of the lower jaw, including the chin barbel. Depending on technique, it is a triangular or V-shaped cut.

Cod tongue is a delicacy in many cod fishery communities: in Basque Country; off the Grand Banks Fishery of Newfoundland, Canada; Iceland; Northern Norway, where cod tongue is traditionally collected by the youth of the community during fishing season; and Portugal. It was historically produced and eaten in other areas, including France and both coasts of the United States.

== Description and production ==
Cod tongues typically weigh around 30–40 grams (1.1–1.4 oz); 1,000 kilograms (2,200 lb) of gutted cod yields ~10 kilograms (22 lb) of tongue. The texture of the lower jaw meat is toothsome compared to cod fillet, similar to a scallop or filet mignon; the chin barbel is more gelatinous in texture.

When not cut out by hand and knife, cod tongue is usually processed by impaling the cod head on a steel spike through the 'tongue', then cutting the tongue out. A mechanical cod tongue cutter was patented in Canada in 1980, and Iceland and Norway in 1983. It uses suction to pull the jaw flesh away from the rest of the head, in order to slice the tongue off.

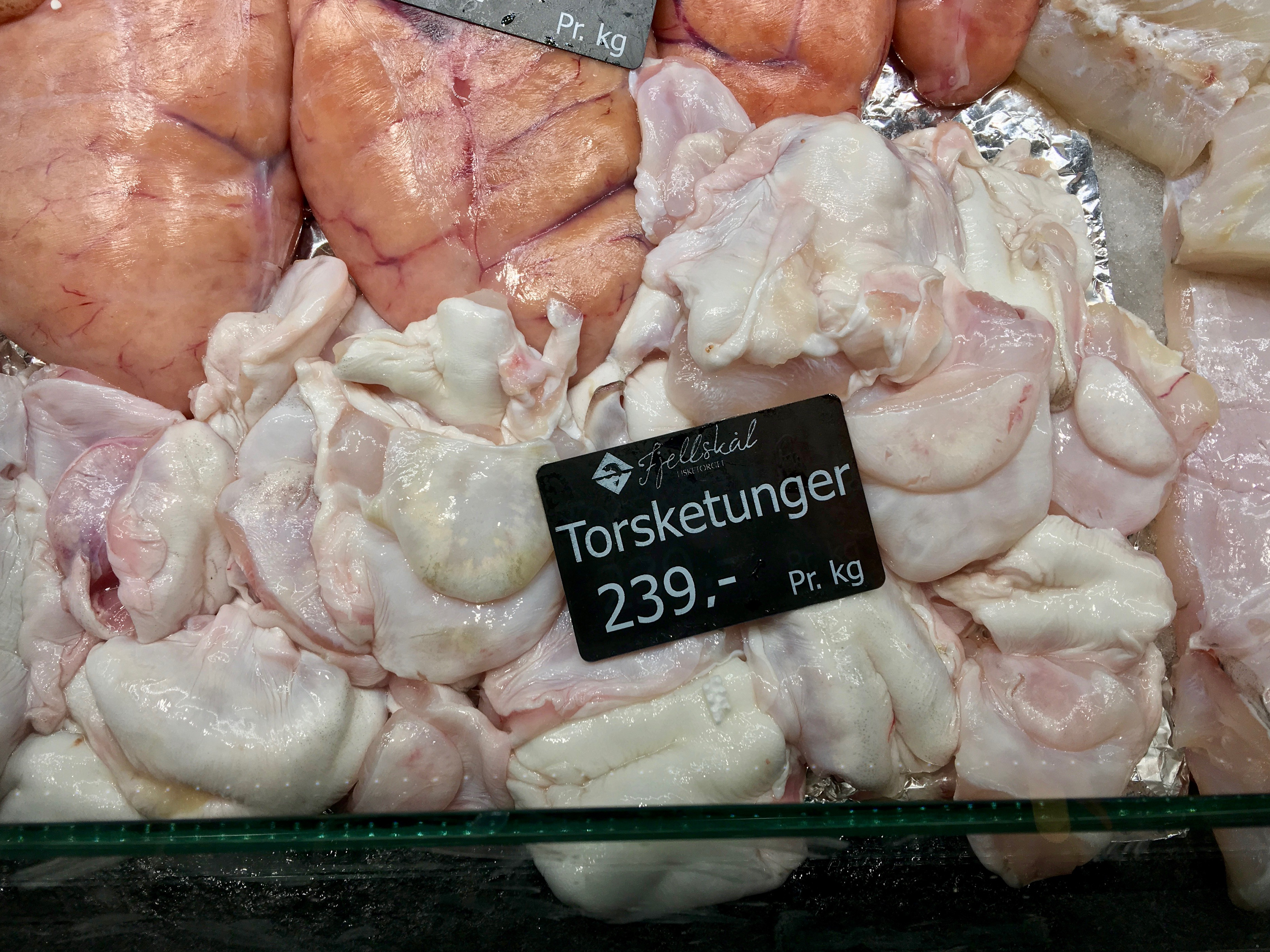
Raw cod tongue (Norwegian: torsketunger) at a fish market

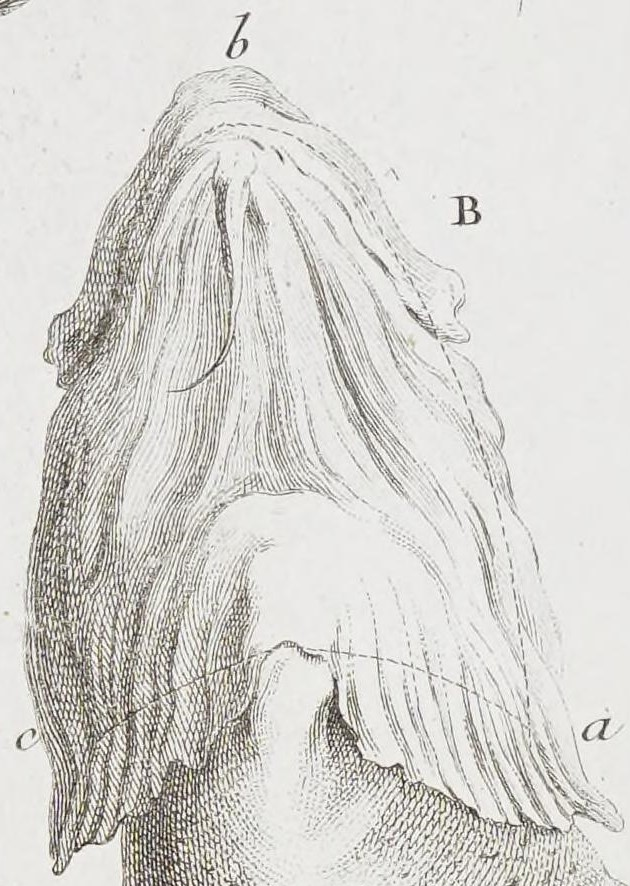
The cut of the cod tongue is marked with the dotted line, a-b-c. The chin barbel is below point b.

== Europe ==
Across many European countries' fishing industries in cod fisheries, cutting off the cod tongue was how fishermen tracked their individual haul. Icelandic, French and Faroese crews historically kept a cod tongue box (Faroese: lippukassan) to track the ship's catch.

=== Belgium ===
In Belgium, cod tongue (Dutch: keeltje lit. 'throat' or keelbitsje, 'throat bit') is traditionally eaten in Ostend. The fried fish dish kaaksjes en keeltjes (lit. 'jaws and throats') sees cod tongue along with fish cheek cooked with onion and vinegar, usually served with potatoes and butter.

=== Iberia ===
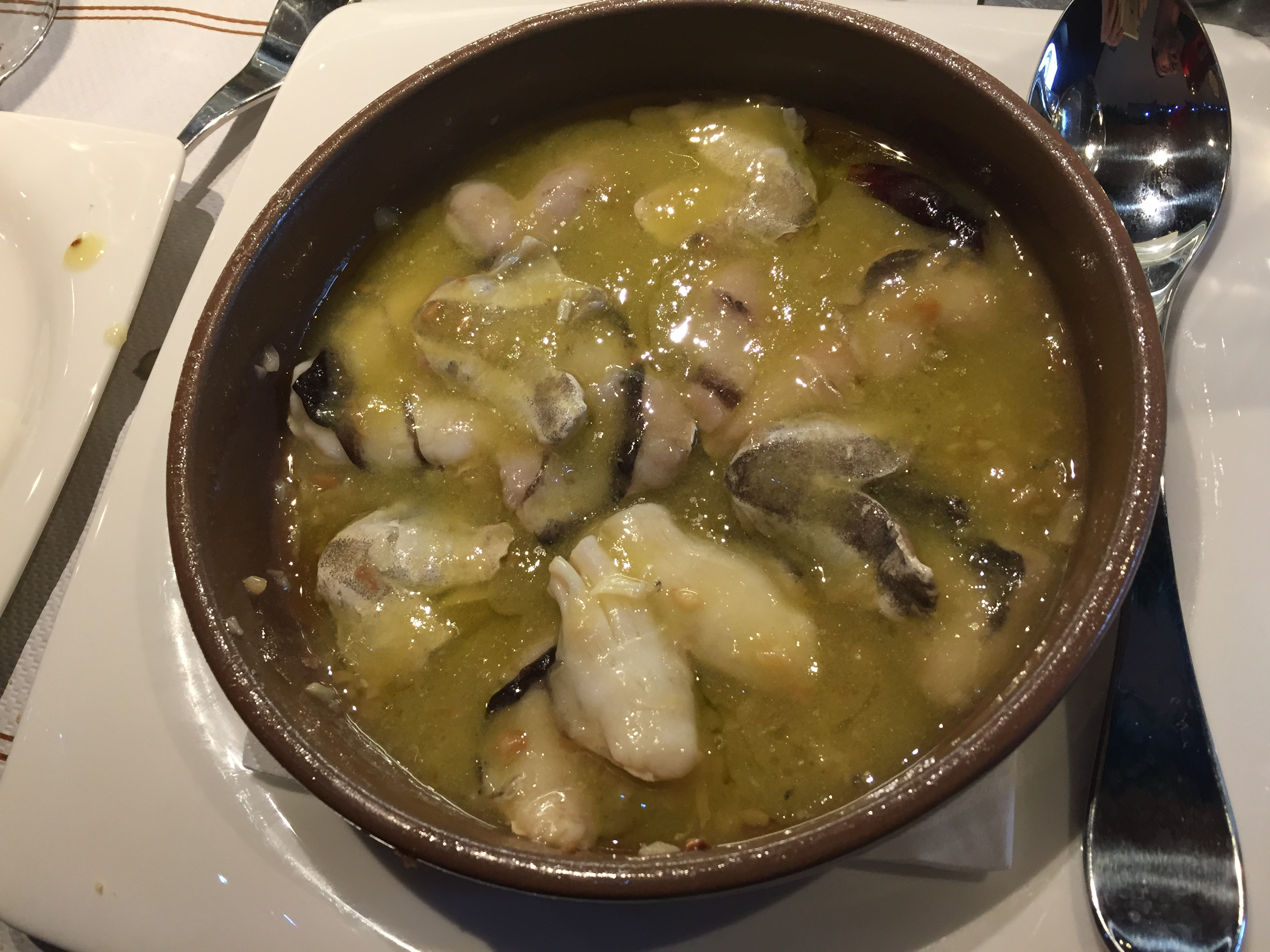
Kokotxas al pil pil in green sauce

In the Basque Country, cod tongue (Basque: kokotxa (Note: also kokotz, kokots, kokoz, kolaspe), Spanish: cococha, lit. 'chin'; Biscayan: bizar/bidar, lit. 'beard') was consumed since at least the late 18th century, when its import to Bilbao from Portugal was regulated by royal proclamation in 1797. The first recorded recipe for cod tongues in Spain was in 1890 in an advice column in the woman's magazine La Moda Elegante, of the Basque cuisine dish lenguas de bacalao a la vizcaína, served in salsa vizcaína. Queen Maria Christina popularized the dish while living in Miramar Palace. She was known to order Basque cider and cazuelas de kokotxas (cod tongue casseroles) to the palace. The txoko Kañoyetan, a traditional Basque all-male gastronomy club, claims Maria Christina to have attempted entry to the club; she was denied, but given kokotxas as consolation. Cod tongues are a popular Spanish Christmas food. A traditional preparation is al pil pil, an emulsion of the gelatin from the tongue with olive oil and herbs. The dish may also be served in green sauce.

Portuguese consumption of cod tongue (Portuguese: línguas de bacalhau) stems from the long history of fishing in Portugal and increased consumption of fish during periods of Catholic abstinence from meat. While coastal areas had fresh fish, inland regions relied on the offal of salted cod, including tongue, fish maw (sames), and cod liver. Cod tongues are a delicacy of Lisbon and are sold salted in bulk, and are served at traditional pubs (tasca). They are typically served fried (línguas de bacalhau fritas).

=== France ===
Consumption of cod tongue in France (French: langue de morue) dates back to the late 16th century: a Jacobin (Dominican) monastery in Bayonne recorded eating them, and Gilles de Gouberville in Contentin recorded purchasing them, calling them nooz de mourue [sic] (from English nose). Cod caught as a part of distant-water fishing in the Grand Banks were salted and brought back to France. French fishermen paraded tongues on sticks to show off their catch.

During distant-water fishing to Greenland in the 1930s, French fishermen operating with only salt for preservation exclusively kept the cods' tongues and cheeks for sale along with halibut, due to the lack of demand for salted cod fillet; refrigerated vessels kept the whole fish. Distant-water cod-fishing ports at the time included Gravelines, Fecamp, Saint-Malo & Saint-Servan, La Rochelle, and Bordeaux.

=== North Atlantic Islands ===
Cod tongue (Faroese: lippur) is a traditional food of Faroese cuisine. The economy of the Faroe Islands is dominated by fishing. On Faroese fishing vessels, fishermen are entitled to the gramsinum, the leftover parts of the catch, which includes cod tongue. However, many trawlers that fillet fish on-board throw fish offal like cod tongue back into the ocean.

Historically, Faroese fishing boats that caught cod on lines paid their crew according to how many fish they had each caught; no such division was possible on trawlers. The boat's owner took two-thirds of the catch; the remaining third was divided among the crew by counting the number of cod tongues or lippur ("lips") each man had placed in the boat's lippukassan, the cod tongue box. Initially agreements were made between each owner and the crew: for example, an 1894 contract for the Lalla Rookh boat specifies that for the purpose of the count, four 'small' fish counted as one 'big' fish. From 1912, a single agreement held for all Faroese boats, and a 'big' cod was defined as being at least 18 inches (46 cm) long. The practice ended when the Faroese line-fishing industry closed in 1958.

Each man cut the tongue from his fish and put it in the box. At the end of the week, the tongues were taken out and counted while the men watched, and the boat's captain wrote down the number of cod each man had caught. The men thus competed for income, benefiting the captain at the same time. Faroese anthropologist Jóan Pauli Joensen states that the lippukassan was a key object in the fishermen's lives, as it governed their livelihoods. Owners competed to hire the most productive fishermen, so, according to Joensen, the lippukassan culture acquired an element of superstition as the men tried to use the most productive fish-hooks to bring them luck—both money and work.

Icelandic and French fishing boats of the period used similar cod tongue box systems to the Faroese; the French worked purely by the number of cod caught, not attempting to distinguish the size of the fish. Shetland boats shared most of the catch equally among the fishermen, with a bonus (between 9 and 17%) awarded on the basis of the remainder of the catch by counting the contents of the cod tongue box. In Joensen's view, the Shetland system was fairer than the Faroese system, as much of the work was not catching but shared duties like cleaning and salting the fish.

Cod tongues (Icelandic: gellur) are a delicacy in Icelandic cuisine. The traditional preparation is boiled with onions and butter (soðnar gellur).

=== Norway ===
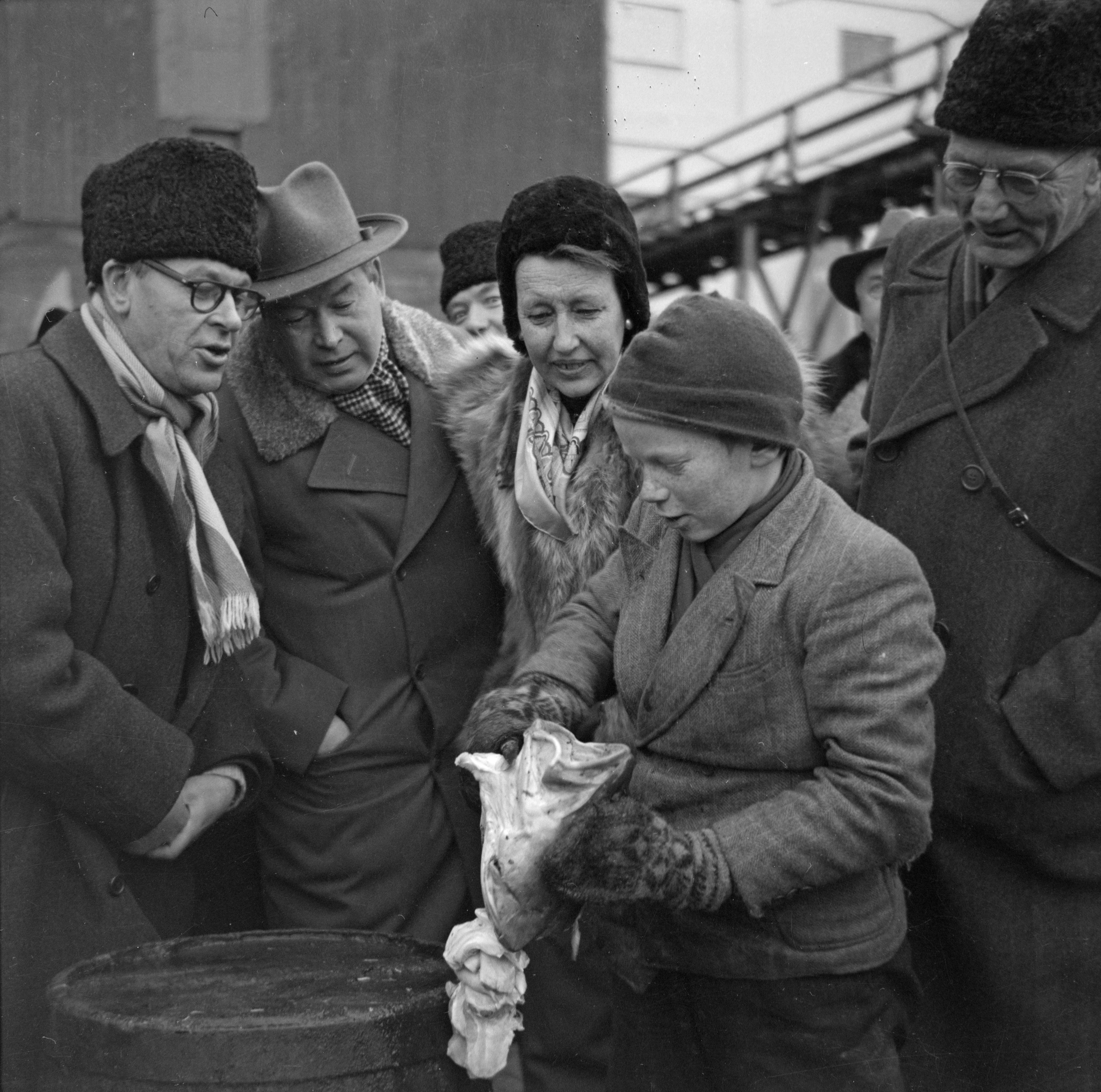
Young Norwegian cod tongue cutter (tungeskjærerne) demonstrating to onlookers

Skrei tongue (Norwegian: torsketunge) is a delicacy in the fishing villages of Northern Norway, particularly during the Lofoten Fishery season of January to mid-April. Local youth work as tongue cutters (tungeskjærerne) from as early as five years old, processing severed heads from stockfish production. Historically, the practice was child labor, with money supporting the family; in modern times, tungeskjærerne hawk the tongues for personal profit. Children are often encouraged to cut tongues to promote early financial literacy and interest in the fishing industry. The tradition of youth tungeskjærerne is declining in some communities, due to the economic pressures of tighter fishery management, greater mechanization, and cheaper migrant labor from Eastern Europe. As a result, local child participation and interest in the fishing industry has waned. Most cod tongues today are sold to markets in Spain, but other destinations include England, France, Germany, Sweden, and Denmark.

== North America ==
=== Canada ===
Atlantic cod was a primary export good of Newfoundland since the late 15th century. Cod tongue was a byproduct of fish processing facilities, eaten by locals on the docks. After the collapse of the Atlantic northwest cod fishery and the ban on industrial cod fishing from 1992 to 2024, cod tongue became an object of culinary tourism. Newfoundland cod tongue is traditionally dredged and fried in pork fat with scrunchions.

Historically, salted cod tongue was produced by the French Canadian fishermen of Cape Breton Island (Île-Royale) in the early 18th century. Cod tongue (French: langue de morue) is a delicacy on the Gaspé Peninsula, both in restaurants and as a home-cooked dish.

=== United States ===
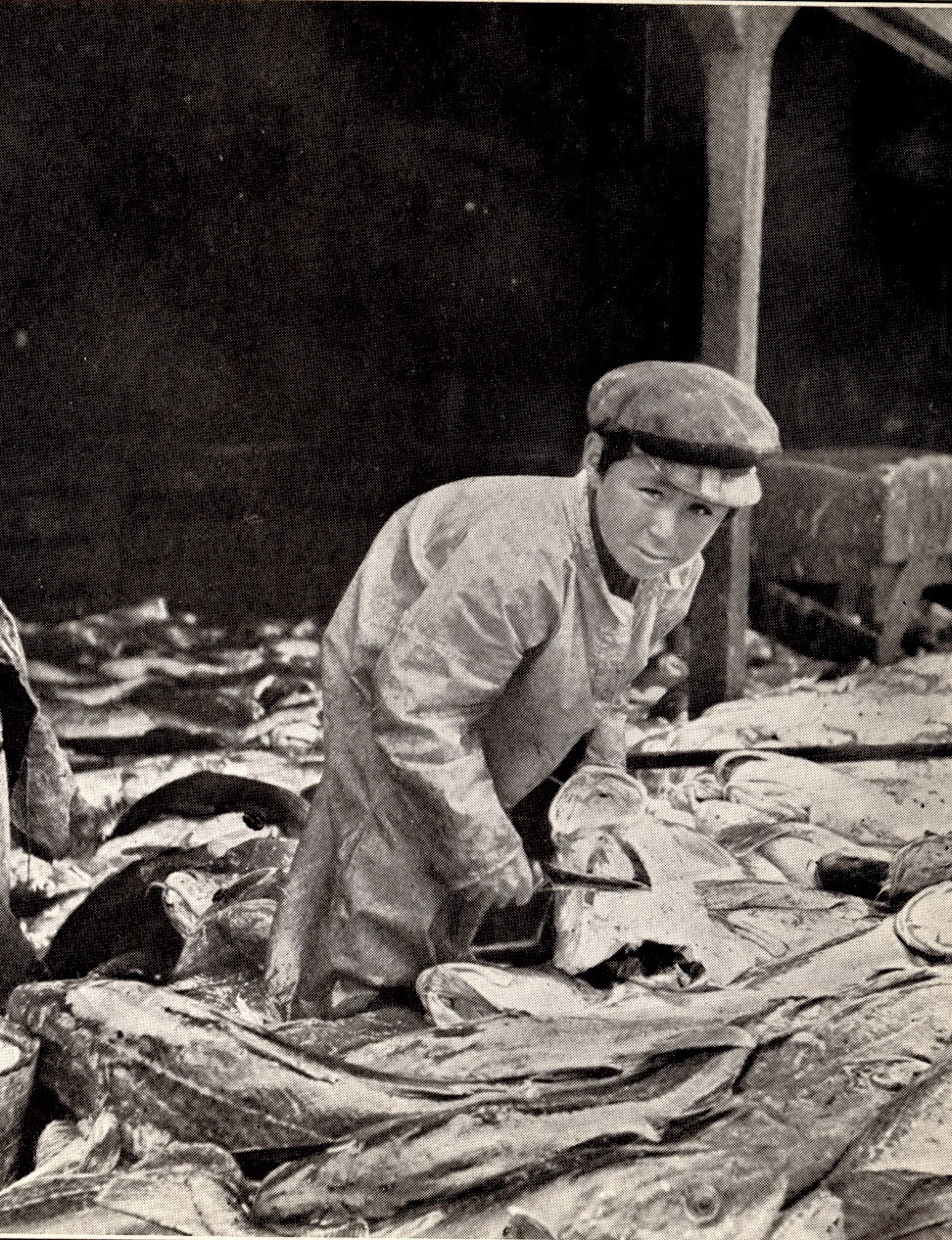
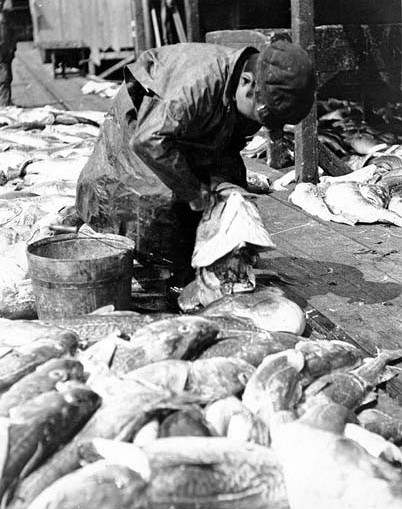
Aleut boys cutting cod tongues, mid-1910s, Pirate Cove, Popof Island

Cod tongue was a valued product during the 19th and 20th century on the Pacific coast of the US, cut from Pacific cod and Alaska pollock caught in the Bering Sea fishery. On vessels with divided labor, tongue-cutters were paid by the pound for tongues; in 1938 during the Great Depression, a tongue-cutter's pay aboard a typical fishing vessel was $7 per 100 pounds cut (equivalent to $156 in 2024), compared to other positions which varied between $0.50 and $3 per ton of gutted cod. Fresh cod tongue was typically dredged in flour and fried, or else salted and packed in barrels for later use. Cod tongue and fish bladders (sounds) were sold together, using Atlantic cod fish bladders for their superior size. Creamed cod tongue on toast was a particular dish served aboard ocean liners.

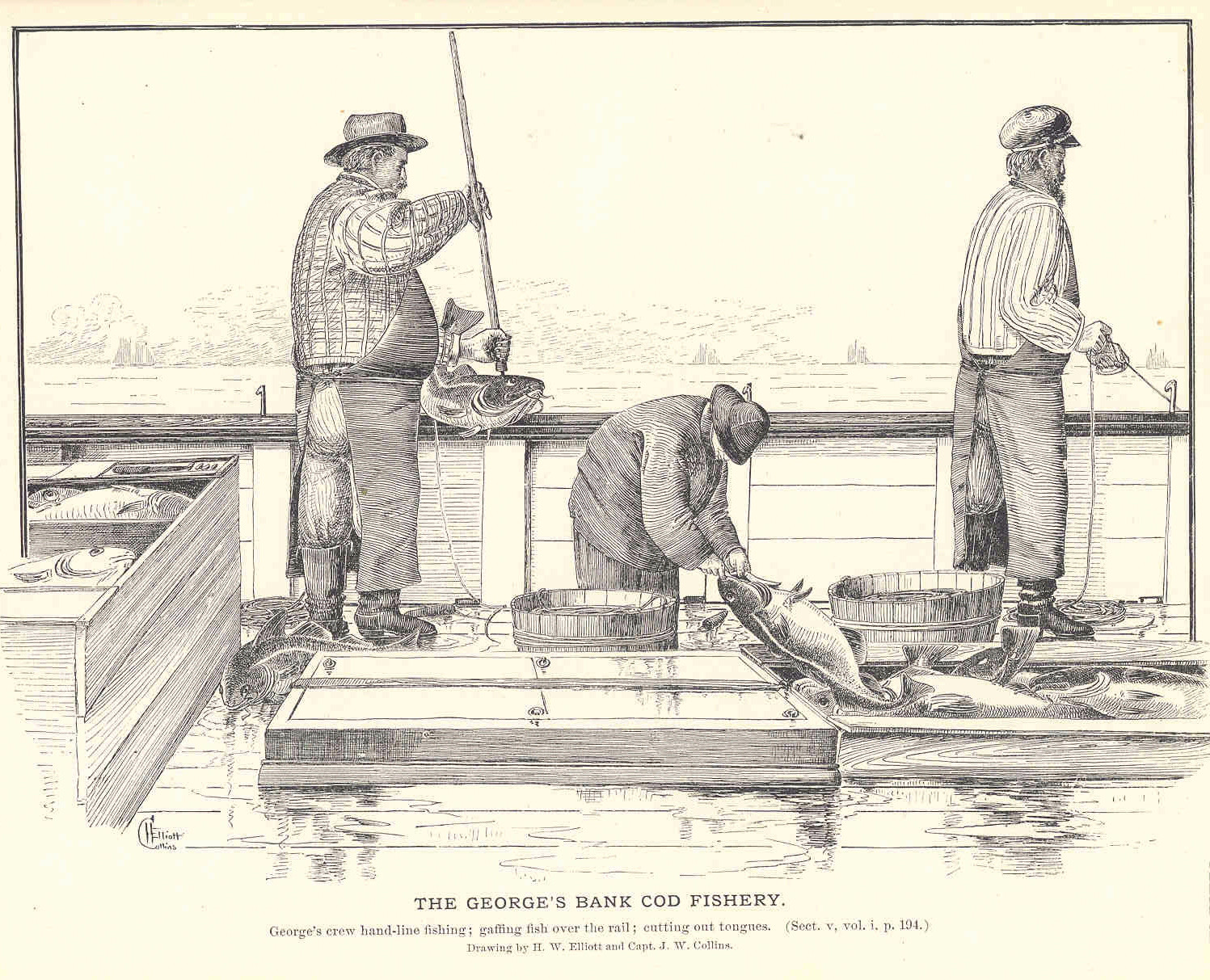
George's Bank cod tongue cutting, c. 1887

In 19th century New England, cod fishing operations in George's Bank and the Isles of Shoals, cod tongue was used as a way to keep count of the catch. Each fish would have the tongue impaled on a spike and cut off to keep track; the rest of the head would be decapitated and dropped into the sea. Other fishing operations like that of South Portland, Maine, would keep the heads and tongues as fishermen's food, frying the latter. By the 1980s, deep-fried cod tongue and cheek was a delicacy in Provincetown, Massachusetts, and other fishing ports on Cape Cod.

== See also ==
- Fish collar
- Tongue as food
