= INRB =

INRB can mean:

- Institut National pour la Recherche Biomedicale, a medical research institute in the Democratic Republic of the Congo
- Instituto Nacional dos Recursos Biológicos, the Portuguese state-run institute for research on biological resources
