= Bacalao al ajoarriero =

Salted cod cooked with vegetables

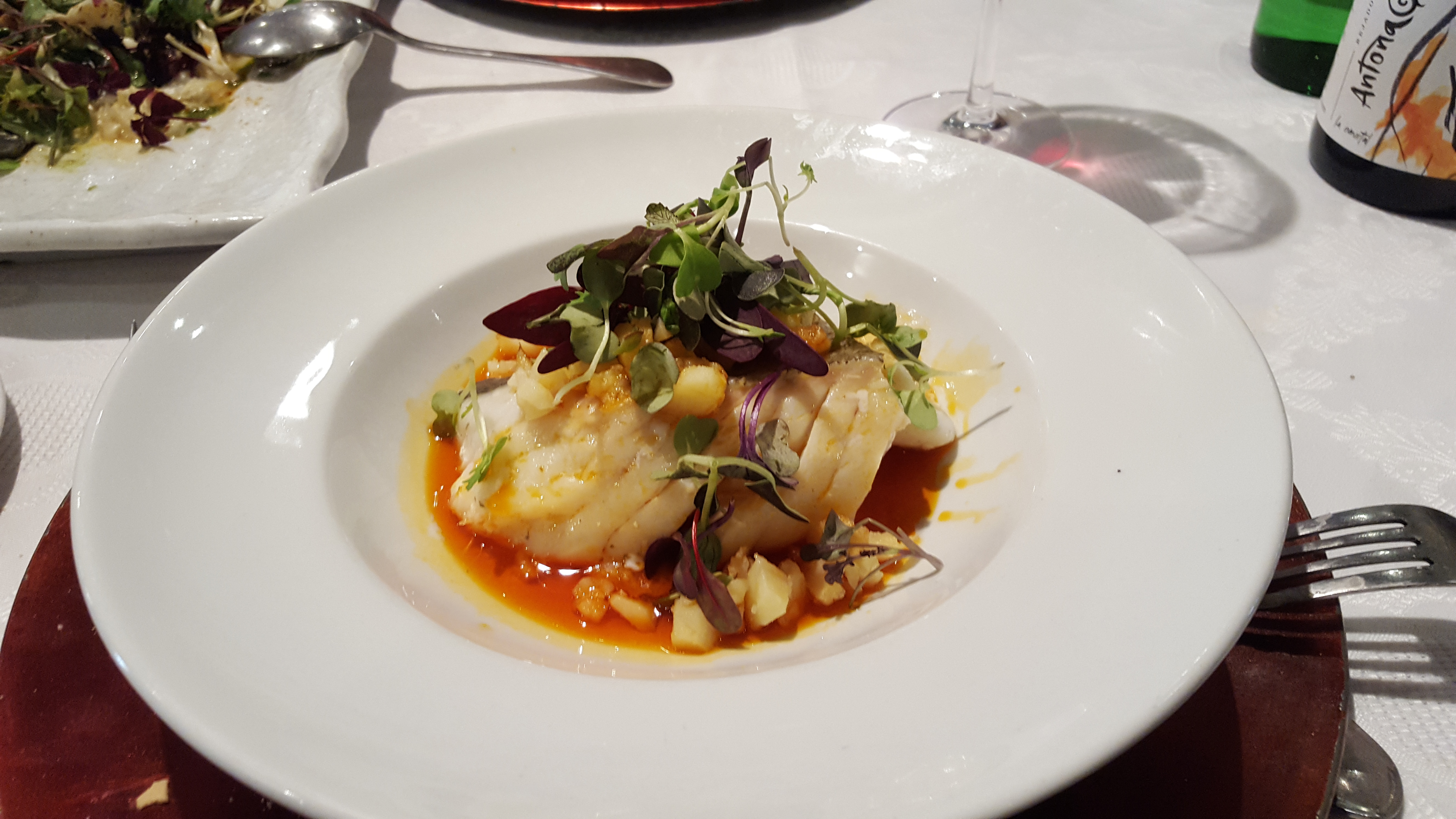
- Alternative names: Bacalao al ajo arriero
- Course: Main course
- Place of origin: Spain
- Region or state: Navarra
- Main ingredients: Salted cod
- Ingredients generally used: Garlic, tomatoes, bell peppers

Bacalao al ajoarriero (also called bacalao al ajo arriero) is a dish featuring salted cod served with a tomato sauce, accompanied by vegetables and peppers. This dish is native to Navarre, Spain. It has been known since at least 1938.

== Preparation ==
First the salted cod is soaked in cold water for 24-48 hours to remove the excess salt, changing water every 8 hours. Once desalted, the cod is drained and scraped clean.

Then the fish is crumbled and poached for about 10 minutes.

For the sauce the onions, garlic and bell peppers are first sautéed . Then tomato puree and paprika are added and cooked. To finish the dish, the cod pieces and sauce are mixed and served.

== See also ==
- Spanish cuisine
- Bacalao al pil pil
- Arepa de arriero
