= Exclusive economic zone of Portugal =

EEZ of Portugal

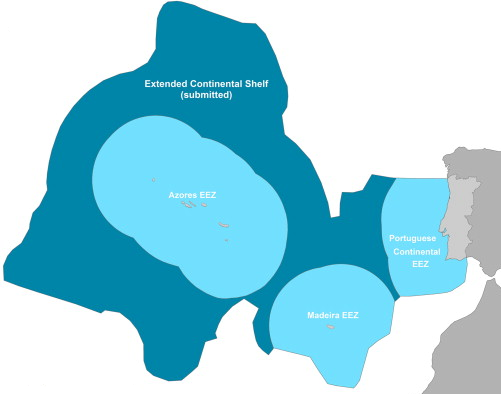
Portugal's Exclusive Economic Zone Possible Extended Continental Shelf (international waters)

Portugal has the 5th largest exclusive economic zone (EEZ) within Europe, 3rd largest of the EU and the 20th largest EEZ in the world, at 1,727,408 km^{2}.

== Portugal's exclusive economic zone ==
- Continental Portugal 327,667 km^{2}
- Madeira Islands 446,108 km^{2}
- Azores Islands 953,633 km^{2}
- Total: 1,727,408 km^{2}

Portugal submitted a claim to extend its jurisdiction over additional 2.15 million square kilometers of the neighboring continental shelf in May 2009, which would result in a marine territory of more than 3,877,408 km^{2}.

== Resolved Dispute with Spain ==
Until 2015, Spain disputed the EEZ's southern border, maintaining that it should be drawn halfway between Madeira and the Canary Islands. Portugal exercises sovereignty over the Savage Islands, a small archipelago north of the Canaries, hence claiming an EEZ border further south. Spain had objected by arguing that the Savage Islands do not have a separate continental shelf, citing article 121 of the United Nations Convention on the Law of the Sea. On the basis of this article, Spain claimed that the Savage Islands were not islands, but instead uninhabitable rocks. The Savage Islands are a protected Portuguese natural reserve, and thus its only year-round inhabitants are workers of Madeira Natural Park who look over the isolated natural reserve, protecting its wildlife. Over the years, the Portuguese authorities have seized some Spanish fishing boats around the area for illegal fishing.

== See also ==
- Continental shelf
- Fishing in Portugal
- International waters
- Territorial waters
