= Fishing industry in Portugal =

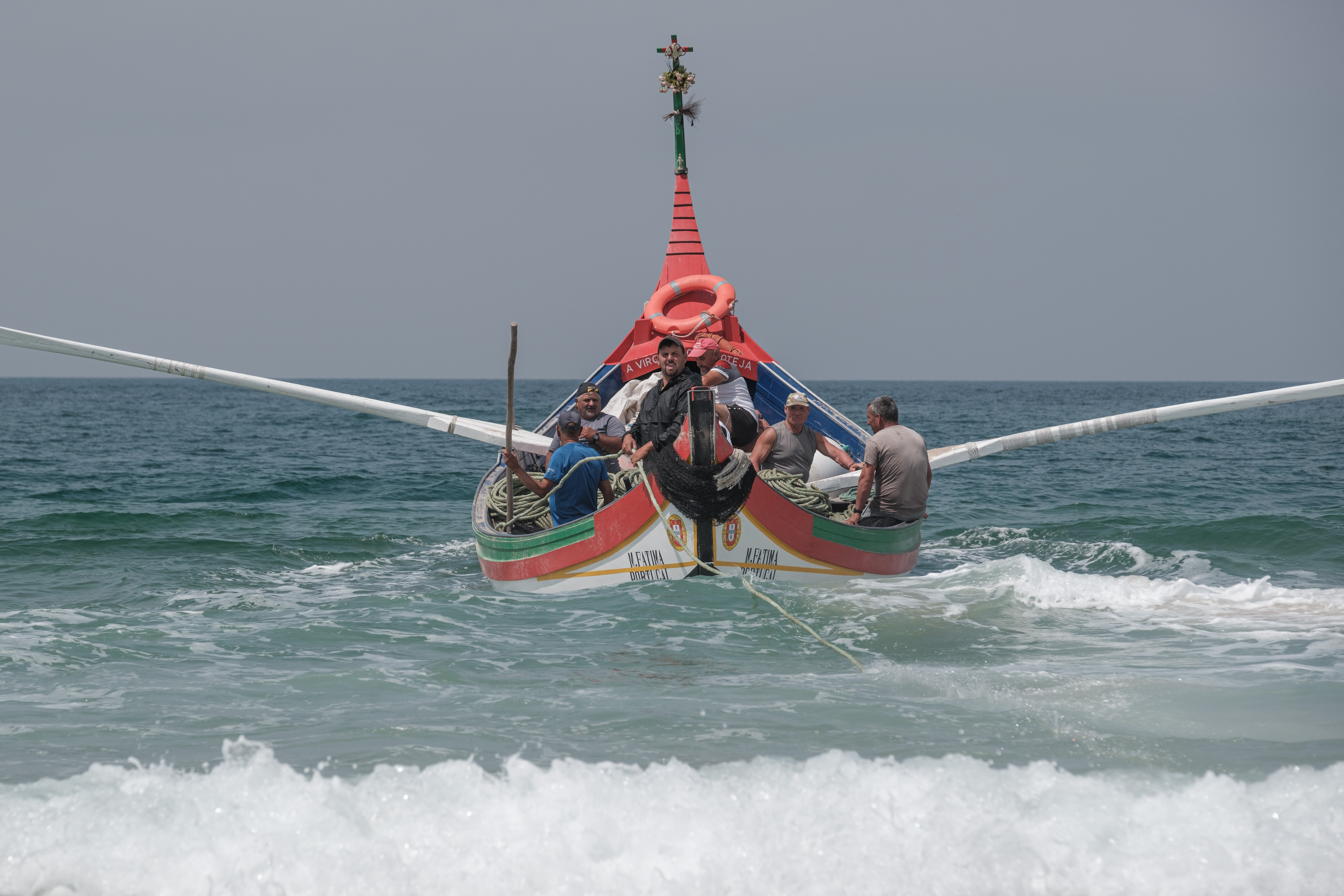
Xávega is a type of traditional fishing still practised in Portugal

Fishing is a major economic activity in Portugal. The country has a long tradition in the sector, and is among the countries in the world with the highest fish consumption per capita. Roman ruins of fish processing facilities have been found across the Portuguese coast. Fish has been an important staple for the entire Portuguese population since, at least, the Portuguese Age of Discovery.

The Portuguese fishing sector is divided into various subsectors, which in turn are divided between industrial fishing and artisanal fishing. As of 2023, artisanal fishers made up about 33% of the workforce, but nearly 75% of the fleet. There are a variety of trade unions and employers' organisations representing sectoral and regional interests.

Portugal's Exclusive Economic Zone, a sea zone over which the Portuguese have special rights over the exploration and use of marine resources, is 1,727,408 km^{2} (666,956 square miles). This is the third-largest Exclusive Economic Zone of the European Union and the twentieth-largest in the world.

Both freshwater and marine aquaculture is well-established in Portugal, from marine fin-fish and shellfish to micro-algae and trout.

== Overview ==
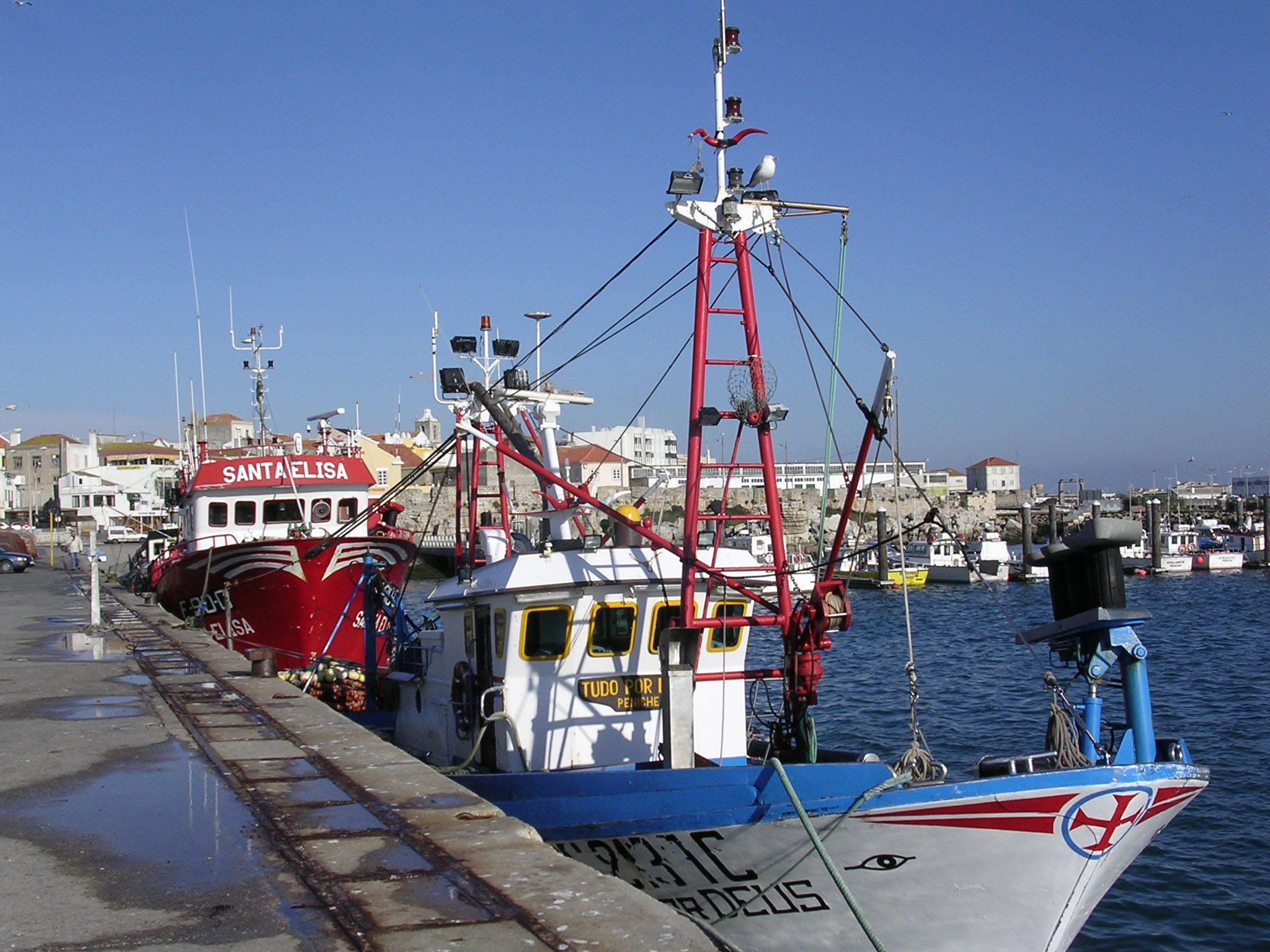
Fishing boats from Peniche.

The fishing sector in Portugal has faced deep structural changes in terms of both the volume of its business and its working conditions since joining the European Economic Community in 1986. The fleet has shrunk from approximately 18,000 in 1986 to 6,800 in 2025 and, during the same time period, the annual nominal catch fell from approximately 332,000 tonnes (366,000 tons) to 119,600 t (131,800 tons). From 1995 to 2022, the number of people employed in capture fishery fell from approximately 32,900 to 12,600.

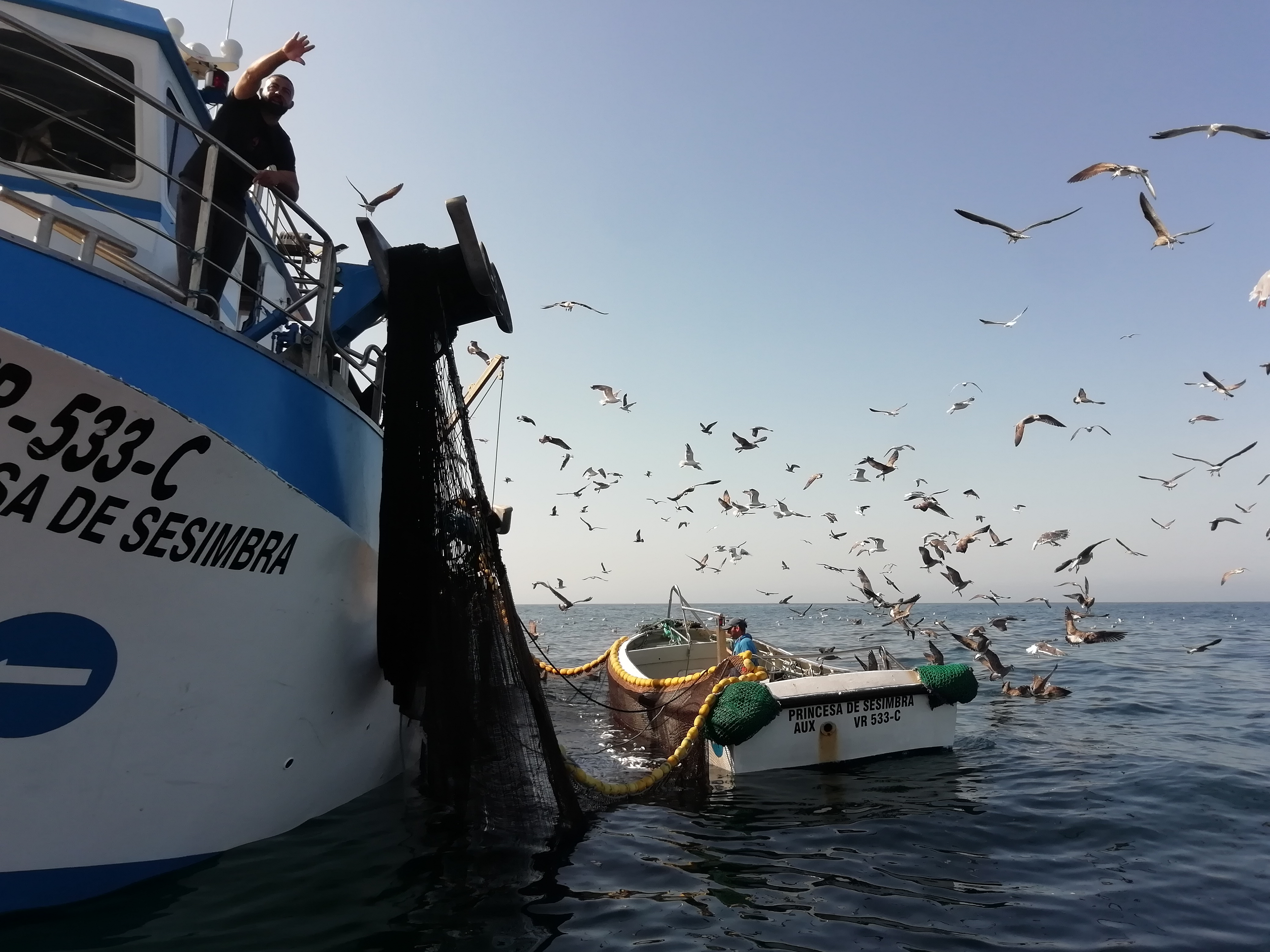
Sardine fishing, near the coast of Sesimbra.

As laid out in its Common Fisheries Policy, the European Union aims to find a sustainable balance between fisheries resources and their exploitation; decarbonize the fishing fleet; and manage the trade of fishery products. The EU has been paying special attention to the situation in Portugal, both because of the characteristics of the Portuguese coastal area and the types of vessel used. The Portuguese fishing fleet has changed significantly, both in size and in character, in order to adjust fishing capacity to the potential of national, EU, non-EU and international waters.

Re-dimensioning of the fleet is key part of the renovation and modernization process. During the 1990s and 2000s, new fishing vessels, with improved on-board fish conservation methods, automated work systems, and electronic navigation and fish detection systems, were gradually introduced . These replaced the ageing fishing vessels from the 1980s and before.

== History ==
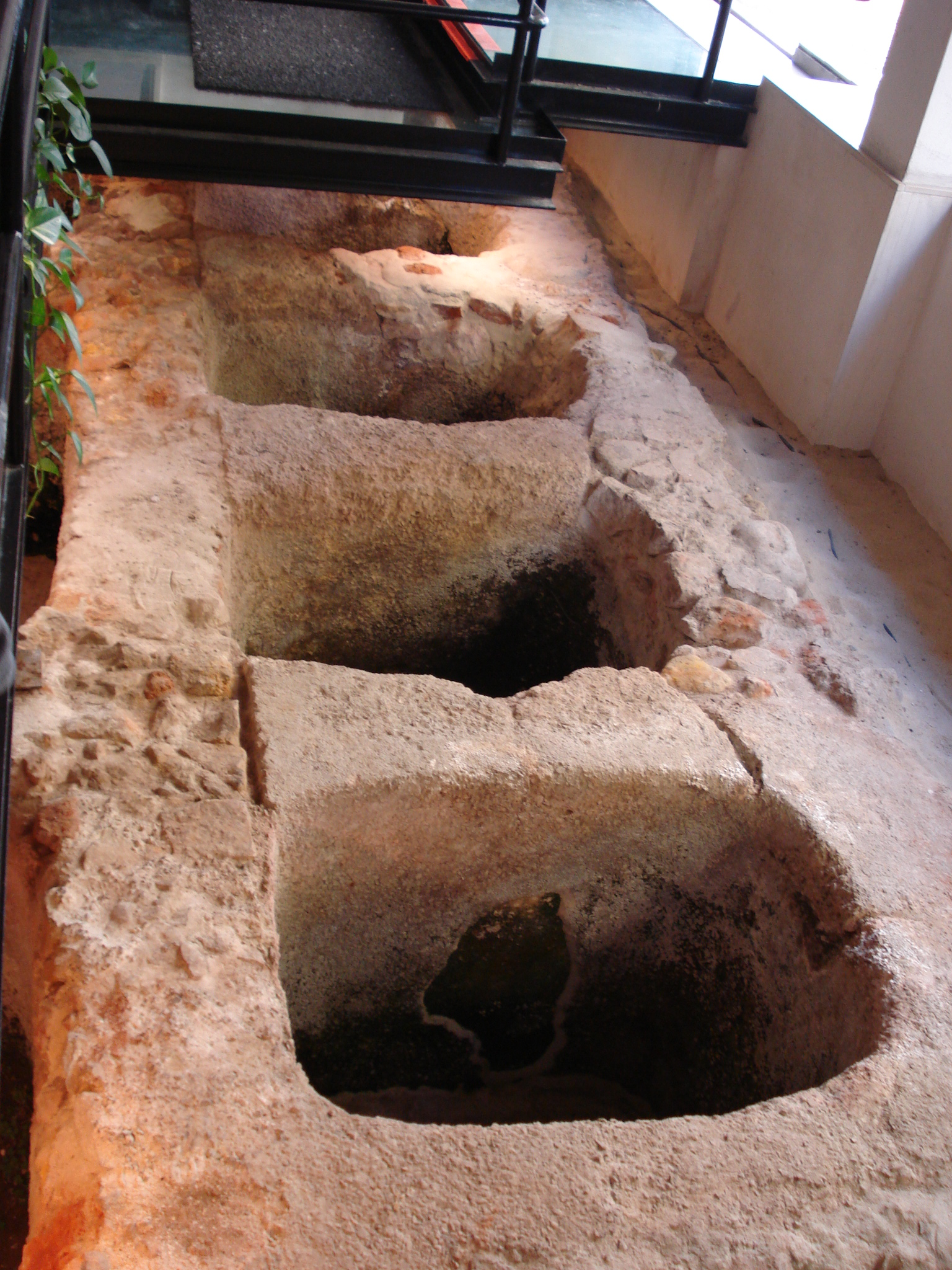
Vestiges of a Roman fish preserving plant, Setúbal.

Roman ruins of fish processing facilities have been found across the Portuguese coast. Garum (a type of fermented fish sauce) of Lusitania (present-day Portugal) was highly prized in Rome. It was shipped to Rome directly from the harbour of Lacobriga (present-day Lagos). The fishing and fish processing industry was so important in the territory that ruins of a former Roman garum factory can be even visited today in the downtown of Lisbon's old quarter. Other remains of fish processing facilities include the Roman ruins of Creiro, Troia and Cerro da Vila.

Fish has been an important staple for the entire Portuguese population since, at least, the Portuguese Age of Discovery. Before refrigeration, there was a need to preserve fish; drying and salting are ancient techniques to keep fish preserved, with both nutrients and flavor. The Portuguese used this method of drying and salting on several fish from their waters, but the ideal fish came from much further north. With the "discovery" of Newfoundland in 1497, Portuguese fishermen started fishing its cod-rich Grand Banks. Thus, bacalhau (salted cod) became a staple of the Portuguese cuisine, nicknamed fiel amigo (faithful friend). It also became a major part of the Portuguese trade industry but, as funds stopped being allocated to the fishing industry, it began to be mostly consumed locally and eventually started to be imported, especially from the town of Kristiansund in Norway.

In the first half of the twentieth century, Portugal invested in cod fishing again and became a major producer and exporter of salted cod. However, throughout the last quarter of the twentieth century into the twenty first century, the fishing industry as a whole has shrunk noticeably.

From 1986 to 1990, the fishing fleet dropped from approximately 18,000 to 15,800. This dropped to approximately 12,100 in 1995, 10,750 in 2000 and 9,960 in 2005. As of 2025, there were exactly 6,780 registered vessels. In 1986, the total capacity of all vessels was approximately 209,000 GT, and the total power of the fleet was exactly 463,504 kW. In 1990, these were approximately 186,000 GT and exactly 497,431 kW, respectively; in 2000, these were approximately 118,400 GT and exactly 402,116 kW, respectively. As of 2025, the total capacity of the fleet was exactly 83,496 GT and the total power was 341,206 kW.

From 1986 to 1990, the annual nominal catch fell from approximately 332,000 tonnes (366,000 tons) to 310,000 t (340,000 tons). This dropped to approximately 212,000 t (234,000 tons) in 1995, 152,000 t (168,000 tons) tonnes in 2000 and 146,000 t (161,000 tons) in 2005. As of 2025, this was exactly 119,570 tonnes (131,800 tons). The volume of imported fish increased by 31% from 1990 to 1999, whereas exports decreased by 0.4% over the same period.

From 1995 to 2000, the number of people employed in capture fishery fell from approximately 32,900 to 27,000, then 20,000 in 2005. As of 2022, this was exactly 12,596. In 1997, 4,932 people were registered as salaried employees in the industrial fishing sector.

== Resource management and regulation ==
The main institution responsible for fisheries management is the Directorate-General for Natural Resources, Safety, and Maritime Services (DGRM), in association with the Secretariat of State for Fisheries and Maritime Affairs, within the Ministry of Agriculture and Fisheries. The Instituto Nacional dos Recursos Biológicos (INRB), as well as the Producer Organizations and Shipowner's Associations, are consulted and have an advisory role in the decision-making process.

The INRB is also responsible for fish stock assessments within the International Council for the Exploration of the Sea (ICES) and the Northwest Atlantic Fisheries Organization (NAFO) frameworks. The INRB uses information collected during research surveys and in fishing ports, and also the catch statistics provided by DGRM. At a national level, INRB has also the role of proposing technical measures to protect and maintain fish stocks.

== Marine fisheries ==
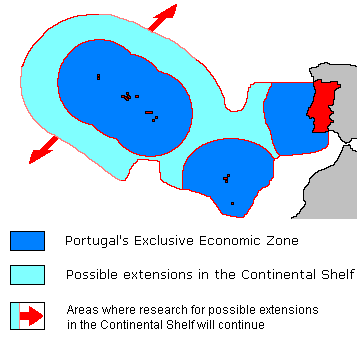
Portugal's Exclusive Economic Zone has 1,727,408 km^{2}.

The Portuguese fishing industry is fairly large and diversified. Fishing vessels, classified according to the area in which they operate, can be divided into local fishing vessels, coastal fishing vessels and long-distance fishing vessels.

The local fleet is mainly composed of small traditional vessels (less than 5 GT), comprising, in 2023, 80% of the total fishing fleet and accounting for 10% of the total tonnage. These vessels use nets, longlines, pots, and traps to catch a diverse range of species. Their physical output is low (in 2023, they accounted for 11% of total catch weight), they provide reasonable levels of income (in 2023, they accounted for 25% of total catch value). This is due to the high commercial value of the species they capture, including octopus, black scabbardfish, conger, pouting, hake and monkfish. Purse seine fishing is also practiced by the local fleet, and traditionally targeted sardine. However, after the introduction of quotas for sardines, target species have increased to include anchovy, horse mackerel and chub mackerel.

In 2023, the coastal fishing fleet accounted for only 20% of vessels but had the largest GT (80%). This includes small industrial boats, known as L12AG (length under 12 meters, active gear), and traditional large-scale fleet. The L12AG fleet comprised 5% of the fleet and 2% of GT, while the large-scale fleet comprised 15% of the fleet and 78% of the GT.

The coastal fishing fleet practices polyvalent, purse seine, dredging, hook-and-line and trawl fishing. Trawlers operate only on the mainland shelf and target demersal species, such as horse mackerel, blue whiting, octopus and crustaceans. Crustacean trawlers target Norway lobster, red shrimp and deep-water rose shrimp.

Despite their name, these vessels may operate in areas farther from the coast, and even outside the Portugal's Exclusive Economic Zone.

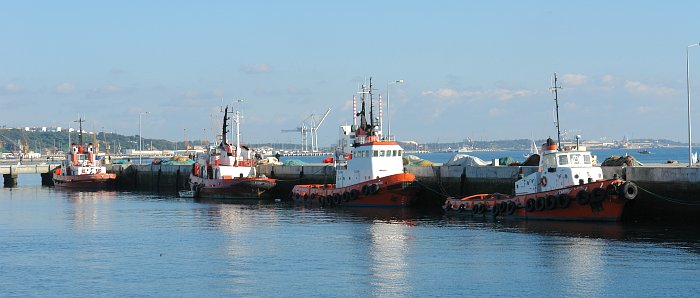
Fishing harbour in Setúbal.

Fishing in foreign waters decreased considerably in the late 90s, after the end of the EU's fisheries agreement with Morocco and the renegotiation of the agreement with Mauritania. A new fisheries agreement between the EU and Morocco was reached, and started in March 2006, after a 7-year interval. In 1999, 40 Portuguese vessels were fishing in Moroccan waters, making Morocco the second-largest foreign fisheries ground at that time.

As of 2023, 19.22% of the total catch weight was from international waters, caught by 13 registered vessels, mainly based in the northwest Atlantic, northeast Atlantic (Norway, Svalbard, Spain and, since 2003, Greenland) and the central Atlantic (Guinea-Bissau, Cape Verde, Senegal, Mauritania). As of 2023, in the northwest Atlantic, Atlantic redfish, golden redfish and Atlantic cod were the most important species. In the northeast Atlantic, it was sardine in Spain, Atlantic cod off Norway and Svalbard, and redfish, cod and Northern Shrimp near Greenland. Throughout the south Atlantic, central Atlantic and Indian Ocean, blue shark dominated catch numbers.

The most important fish species landed in Portugal in 2023 were chub mackerel, sardine and horse mackerel, representing 25%, 19% and 12% of total landings by weight, and 5%, 8% and 7% of total value, respectively. Molluscs accounted for only 13.5% of total landings in weight, but 28% of total landings in value. Crustaceans were 1.5% of the total landings by weight and 6% by value.

The main landing sites in Portugal in 2023 (including the Azores and Madeira), according to total landings in weight by year, were the harbours of Sesimbra, Peniche, Matosinhos, Olhão, Aveiro, Figueira da Foz, Sines, Ilha de São Miguel, Caniçal (Madeira) and Portimao.

=== Management ===
The main objective of the national fisheries policy, particularly since 2002, is to maintain the sustainability of the sector, help manage overfishing and stock decline, and stabilize the fishing economy. This is inline with the EU's Common Fishery Policy.

To achieve this objective, several measures have been adopted. These include structural modernization of the fishing and processing industries and the aquaculture sector; the establishment of annual quotas for some species and fishing areas; the application of technical conservation measures; and limitation of fishing effort.

=== Input control ===
Input controls restrict fishing effort, focusing on the vessels, gear, time spent at sea and locations fished. Vessels in Portugal are controlled by a licensing system, where acquisition, construction or modification of vessels requires prior authorization. Portugal operates a replacement-only policy, where vessels can only enter the fishing fleet as a replacement for another boat which leaves the fleet. The use of certain fishing methods is also subject to prior authorization and annual licensing. Each method is clearly delineated, with restrictions on when and where it can be used, and certain other requirements, like mesh size, noted. The objective is to allow the modernization of the fishing fleet without increased fishing effort; improve working conditions; and promote conservation measures by encouraging the use of less predatory fishing gear.

Portugal also has strict restrictions on when certain species can be caught, and which types must be returned if caught: for example, all egg-bearing lobsters and langoustines must be immediately returned if caught without fishing gear. Marine Protected Areas, especially around the Azores and Madeira, have also been established.

=== Output controls ===
Output controls control the number, size and species caught. This is established through TACs, species quotas, management plans for specific species, restrictions on size of fish caught and restrictions on bycatch amounts. Management plans are in place for eel, sardine, tuna, ray, anchovy and dredges. Several species, including swordfish, ray, cod, anchovy and tuna are subject to quotas in national waters. Quotas can be allocated to individual vessels, as is the case for vessels operating in North Atlantic Fishery Organization (NAFO) and Norwegian fishing grounds; or to groups of vessels, as is the case for the purse seine fishery, where sardine catch limits are divided among Producer Organizations. Individual vessel quotas are also transferable within a shipowner's fleet to facilitate flexible management and therefore maximum utilization of these quotas.

== Inland fisheries ==
In 2025, 84 tonnes (93 tons) of fish were landed by inland fisheries, with a value of €1.3 million. The main species landed were shad (Alosa sp.), lamprey (Lampetra fluviatilis) and eels, which were roughly 77%, 9.5% and 12% of total landings from this fishery, respectively. Purse-seine nets, bottom trawl, gill nets (except when targeting lamprey) and gear that uses tidal movements are prohibited in inland waters. There are also limitations on fishing areas and gear characteristics, such as mesh and gear size.

Recreational fishing is common and popular in inland fresh water streams, lakes, reservoirs and rivers. Every recreational fisher must respect the rules and be aware of several limitations on when, where and how fishing can be done. Furthermore, recreational fishing requires a license, for which a yearly individual fee must be paid to the state, and there are limits on how many fish can be retained and what species can be caught.

=== Aquaculture ===
Until the mid-1980s, aquaculture production consisted of freshwater trout and bivalves in tidal estuaries. Following Portugal's entry into the EU, its aquaculture production showed an increase during the late 80 but decreased in 1990s, mainly due to a lack of funds. Despite some fluctuation since then, the overall trend has been positive. Nowadays, both freshwater and marine aquaculture is well-established in Portugal, producing several different species. Total production in 2024 was 19,827 tonnes (21,856 tons), 19,689 t (21,703 tons) of which was in marine or brackish waters, and 138 of which was island. This consisted mostly of carpet shells (4,756 t (5,243 tons)), oysters (4,024 t (4,436 tons)), turbot (3,634 t (4,006 tons)) and gilthead seabream (3,428 t (3,779 tons)) in marine farms, and trout (137 t (151 tons)) from inland farms.

The objective of the national fisheries policy regarding aquaculture is to create jobs, make quality and healthy products available to consumers, promote health and animal welfare standards for cultivated species and ensure the environmentally balanced development of aquaculture activity." Structural modernization of the aquaculture sector is also promoted within the present fisheries management plan. These objectives are in accordance with those established by the European Union in the Common Fisheries Policy and, in particular, with the 2002 Strategy for the Sustainable Development of European Aquaculture, which promotes environmental, economic and social sustainability.

One of the main aquaculture projects of Portugal is Pescanova's production centre in Mira, Centro region. The southern Portuguese region of the Algarve is also a major aquaculture centre.

In 2017, aquaculture production reached a volume of 12,549 t (13,833 tons) and a value of €83.2 million. These values correspond to an increase of 11.5% in quantity and 10.6% in value, compared to the values of the previous year. In 2024, the total value was €186,149 million, and volume was 16,865 t (18,590 tons).

== Fish processing industry ==
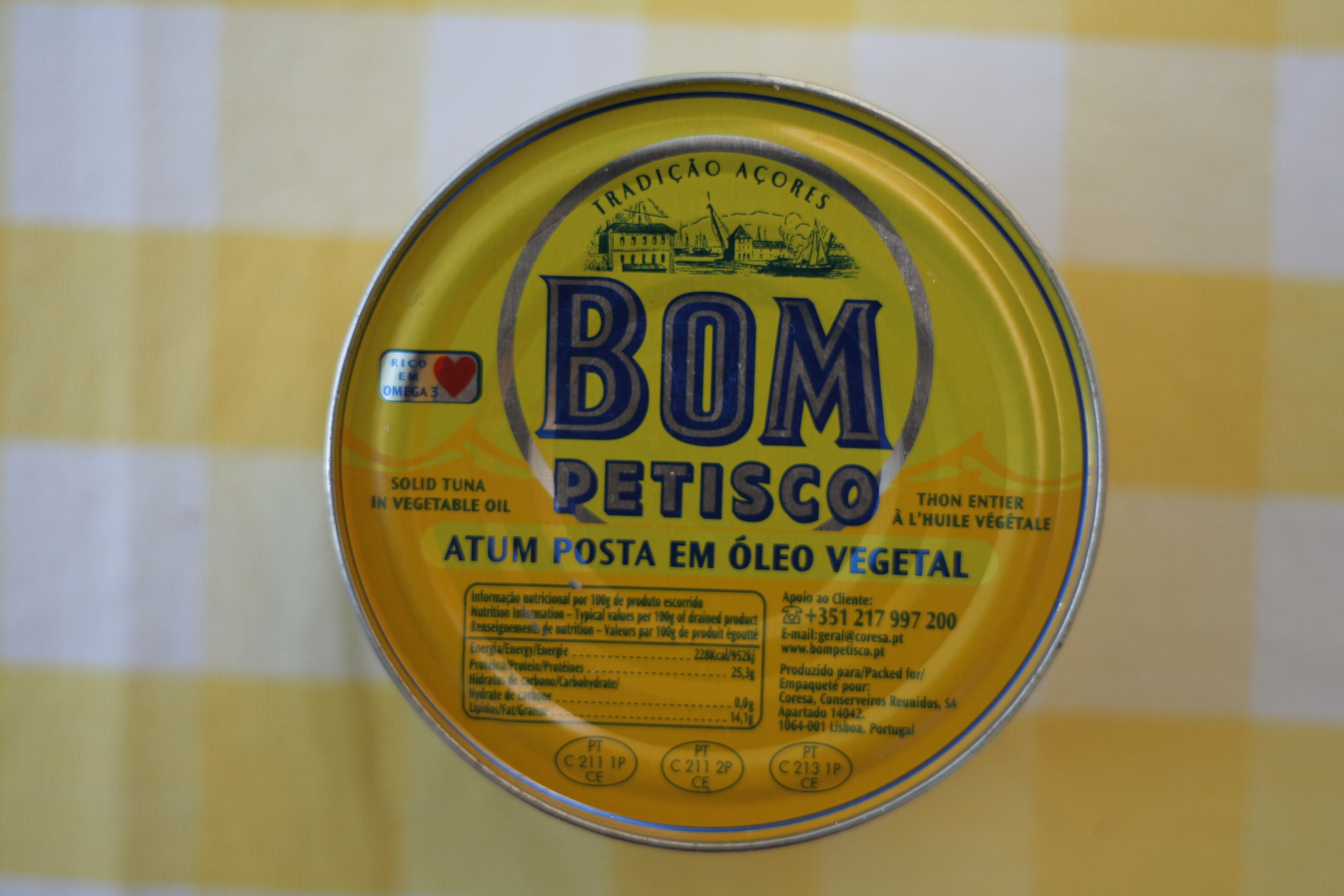
Bom Petisco canned tuna

There are many canned fish processing plants across Portugal, producing under different trademarked brands which are mostly exported. As of 2025, Portugal had 20 fish canning facilities, which produce 44,000 tonnes (49,000 tons) of canned fish annually, 65% of which is exported. The mainland's principal ports specialized in canning small pelagic fish, mostly sardine, are in the Matosinhos-Póvoa de Varzim area, Peniche, and Olhão.

In the Azores, the canned tuna fish industry is predominant, and almost all of the production is exported. Since the 2010s, scabbardfish have also started to be canned and exported, although this was still considered an experimental fishery as of 2024.

Notable fish processing companies include major companies like Briosa, Cofaco, Cofisa, and the Portuguese branch of Pescanova, and smaller, artisanal canneries like Conserveira do Sul, Conservas Ramirez (the world's oldest canned fish producer still in operation), Fábrica de Conservas da Murtosa and Conservas Portugal Norte. Portuguese processed fish products are exported through several companies under a number of different brands and registered trademarks, like Ramirez, Bom Petisco, Briosa Gourmet, Combate, Comur, Conserveira, General, Inês, Líder, Manná, Murtosa, Pescador, Pitéu, Porthos, Tenório, Torreira, and Vasco da Gama.

== Fish consumption ==
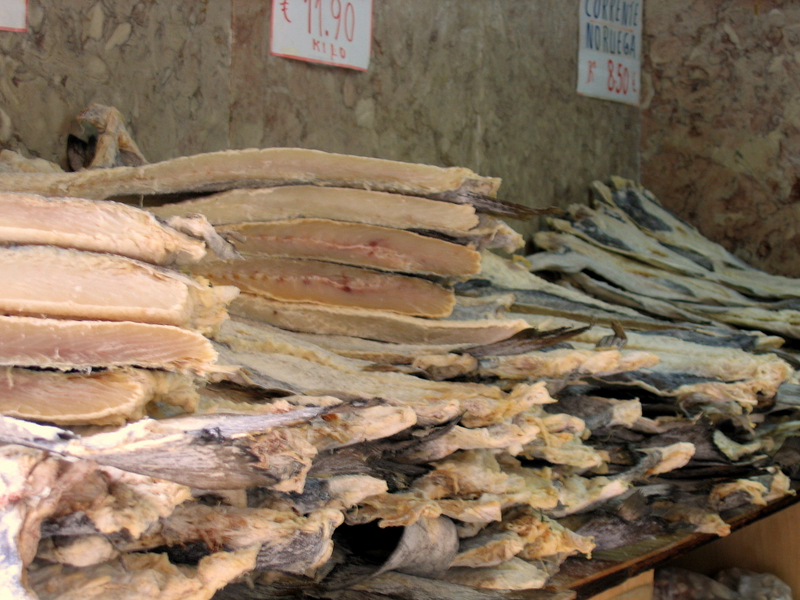
Salted cod in a Lisbon market

Portugal, as an Atlantic country and a historically seafaring nation, has a long tradition in the sector of fishing. It is among the countries in the world with the highest fish consumption per capita. Portuguese cuisine includes a variety of fish and other seafood-based dishes, some of which are internationally renowned.

The most widely used species in Portuguese cuisine is cod, known in Portugal as bacalhau. Species like the sardine, Atlantic mackerel, tuna, and the European hake are also important.

== Education, training and research in fishing ==
In Portugal, there are several vocational and higher education institutions devoted to the teaching of fishing, fisheries, oceanography, marine biology and marine science in general. For example, the state-run polytechnic institute Instituto Politécnico de Leiria at Peniche, through its Escola Superior de Turismo e Tecnologia do Mar de Peniche, has a school of marine technologies which awards bachelor's and master's degrees in these subjects.

There are also a number of universities which award bachelor's, masters' and doctorate degrees in varied marine science subfields, as well as research and development work. The ocean, marine biology and marine sciences degrees awarded by the University of Algarve and the New University of Lisbon are among the most prestigious in the country. The INRB is the national research institute for agriculture and fisheries.

== See also ==
- Agriculture in Portugal
- Economy of Portugal
- Portugal's Exclusive Economic Zone
