= Cofaco =

Portuguese canned fish company

Cofaco is a Portuguese canned fish company, headquartered in Lisbon with industrial facilities in the Azores.

== History ==
In 1961, Cofaco was created in the Algarve. Its head office was in Vila Real de Santo António. The tuna fish is rare in the Algarve. Cofaco fishes in the Azores where the tuna passes and its migration routes begin. Currently, Cofaco is mainly located in the Azores and its industrial poles are concentrated in the islands of Pico, (Madalena do Pico), and S. Miguel (Rabo de Peixe). Its main brands include Bom Petisco, pitéu, líder, Ás do Mar, Bon Appetit, and Santamaria.

== See also ==
- Fishing in Portugal
