= Lofoten Fishery =

Norwegian traditional fishery

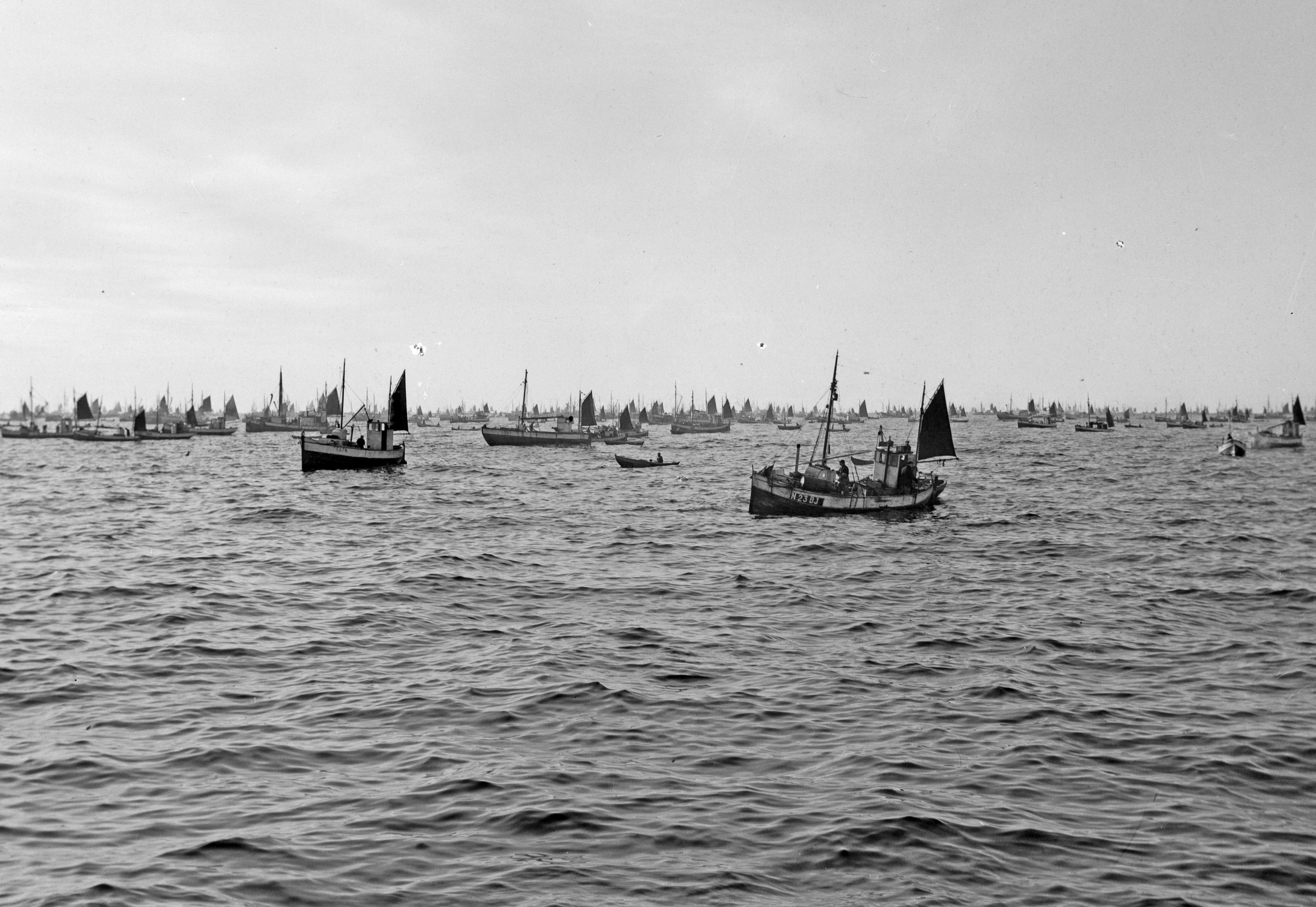
The Lofoten Fishery - Svolvaer, Lofoten. Photographer: Kristian Magnus Kanstad (1907-1983)

The Lofoten fishery is considered a Norwegian traditional and culturally rich fishery. It has for many centuries played an important role for both the local and the national economy. It takes place every year, typically starting in January lasting till mid-April, around the Lofoten Islands in the Northern parts of Norway. Fishermen from all along the Norwegian coast still travel to Lofoten to take part in the fishery.

== History ==
The exact year of origin of the Lofoten fishery is not known, but it is said that it is a century-year old tradition stretching as far back as history goes. Around 100 years ago, about 30,000 fishermen participated in the Lofoten fisheries. Today the number has decreased remarkably, and the number varies from around 2000 to 4000 fishermen.

The fishing methods have also changed since the beginning of the Lofoten fishery. Up to the beginning of the 19th century, fishing was carried out from open boats and with traditional tools such as fishing lines and - nets. At the beginning of the 20th century, the boats became more motorized, making it easier to fish large quantities but with a smaller crew.

Lofoten has become one of the greatest fishing destinations because of its rich waters as cod migrates from the Barents Sea to the northern Norwegian coast to spawn. The Lofoten fishery is a century-old livelihood, being one of Norway's main export goods, not only bringing wealth to the fishermen, but the effects of the fishery have also expanded and been of importance to the whole nation. The Lofoten fishery is still accounted to be one of the world's largest seasonal fisheries and is for many fishermen the most important source of income. While large parts of the mid- and northern-Norwegian coast are suitable for cod-fishing, the majority of the cod was caught in Lofoten, making up for 40% - 50% of the total catch in the 1900s.

In 1816, a new law was introduced, the so-called "Lofotloven". Lofotloven was considered to be a result of the liberalistic economic politics at the time, as it opened up for the opportunity to use all types of tools, both fishing- lines and -nets, aiming to make the fishing activities in Lofoten more efficient. The local middle-class in Lofoten, many referred to as "væreiere", did to a large extent control the fishing fields, who, when and where the fishermen could fish. This practice was changed in 1857, and while the ocean was considered open for all, Lofotloven as of 1857 ensured increased regulations and state supervision of the activities conducted in the waters surrounding Lofoten.

== Production ==
The climate during the Lofoten fishery has proved itself optimal for stockfish production. Drying the fish is the ideal conservation method as the fishery takes place over several months, also making it easier to transport the fish home due to its reduced weight. Historically, stockfish became one of Norway's main export products in the early 1100s. when trade between Norway and Europe became more frequent, making Lofoten the center of production of stockfish. The black death did though affect Lofoten and the Lofoten fishery to a large degree and the societal changes following the black death reduced the fishing capacities, but the Lofoten fishery survived and fishermen received good prices for their fish. The prices for the fish have varied throughout the decades, depending on several factors, for example, demand and supply. Solid catches and large quantities of fish opened up for the production and export of other fish-related products as well. Cod liver oil, which is very rich in Omega-3, and cod roe were exported to Europe, ensuring revenues for Norway when the stock fish production stagnated in the 18th and 19th century.

== Climate threats and oil drilling ==
There is concern that the current climate changes may threaten the great Lofoten fishery. Scientists suggest that the rising temperatures may have several negative impacts on the arctic waters near Lofoten. The results of these temperature changes may result in a change in migration-patterns, forcing the cod to drift to colder waters further north. In the 1970s, the Norwegian Government opened up for talks regarding oil activities in the Northern-Norwegian region. Oil drilling outside the Lofoten Islands could also threaten the whole fishing industry, including jobs and natural habitats. Traditions could become lost, many would lose their livelihoods and the landscape and wildlife would be severely affected if the Norwegian government decided to start oil and gas extraction in Lofoten, Vesterålen and Senja.
