= Basihyal tooth plate =

The basihyal tooth plate is a specialized structure found in certain fish species. Basihyal tooth is the tooth that is attached to the basihyal tooth plate.

It is part of the basihyal, a cartilage element located in the floor of the mouth that forms part of the hyoid apparatus, supporting the tongue and facilitating feeding mechanisms.

== Structure ==
The basihyal tooth plate is typically composed of a set of hard, mineralized tissues embedded within or attached to the basihyal cartilage. These teeth or denticles are arranged in patterns that can vary between species, often reflecting adaptations to specific dietary needs. The shape, size, and arrangement of these teeth are influenced by the feeding ecology of the organism.

== Function ==
The primary function of the basihyal tooth plate is to assist in the capture, manipulation, and processing of food. In many species, it serves as a crushing or grinding surface, particularly for prey with hard exoskeletons such as crustaceans or mollusks. In others, it may act as a gripping mechanism to hold slippery prey, such as fish or squid, in place.
