= Bacalao al pil pil =

Traditional Basque dish

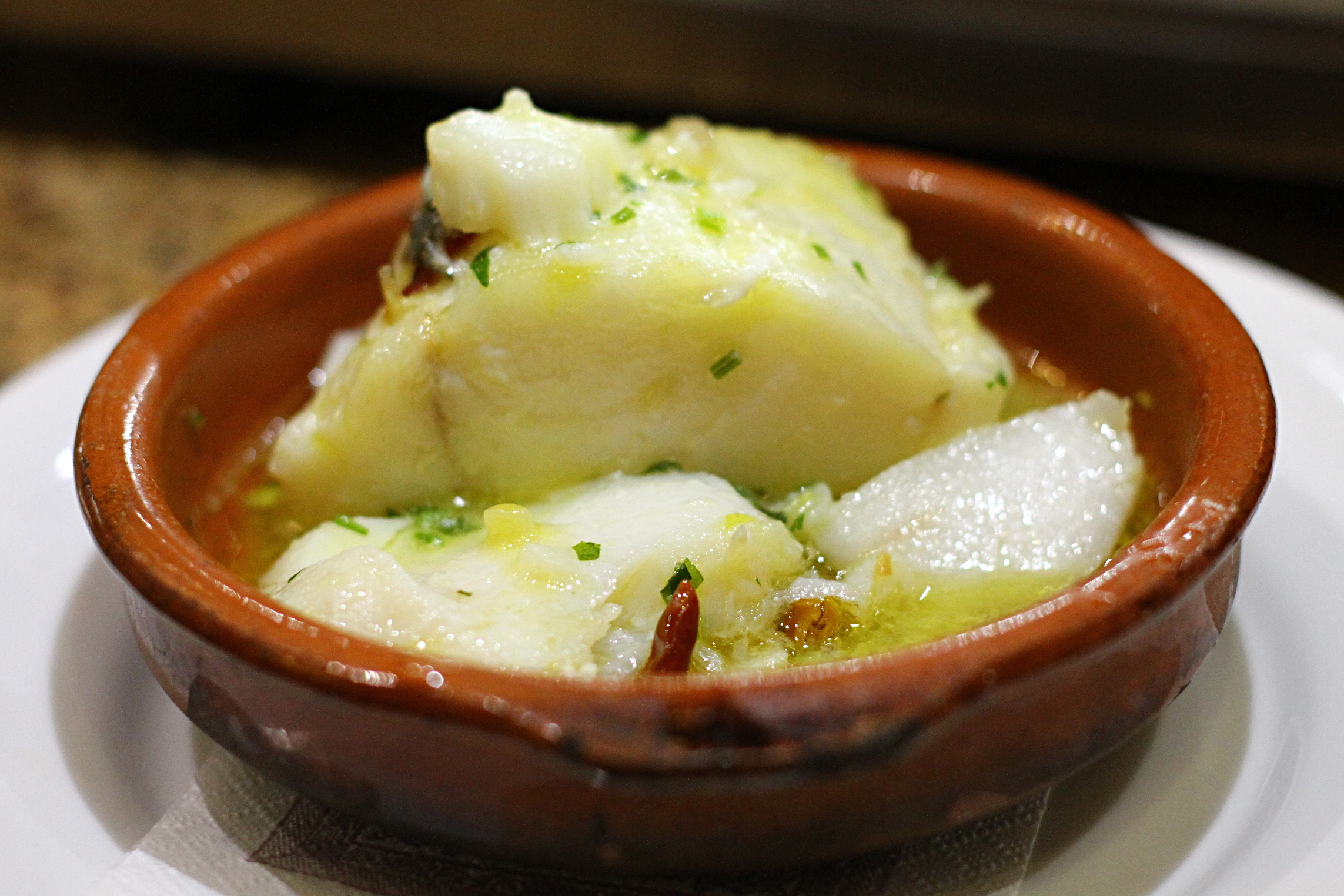
- Course: Main course
- Place of origin: Spain
- Region or state: Basque Country
- Main ingredients: Salted cod
- Ingredients generally used: Garlic, olive oil

Bacalao al pil pil is a traditional Basque dish made with bacalao (salted cod), garlic, and olive oil. The cod is gently poached in olive oil and served with an emulsion sauce made from the olive oil, the cod's natural juices, and gelatin called pil pil. This dish has been popular in Northern Spain for centuries.

== Etymology ==
Al pil pil is an onomatopoeic term, in reference to the sound of pan-frying cod, with its connective tissue breaking down and splattering.

== Preparation ==
First, the garlic is thinly sliced and sautéed in olive oil. The pan is then removed from the heat for the oil to cool down. (Some recipes call for the garlic to be removed and added at the end.) Once cooled, pieces of cod are added to the oil, skin side up. The oil is gradually reheated to a low temperature, and the cod is gently cooked for about 20 to 30 minutes. During this time, the pan should be continuously moved to create the emulsion sauce. The fish is served with the sauce poured over it. Dried or fresh chili is sometimes used to flavor or garnish the dish.

== See also ==
- Basque cuisine
- Marmitako
- Piperrada
