= Instituto Nacional dos Recursos Biológicos =

Portuguese research institute

Instituto Nacional dos Recursos Biológicos (INRB) is the Portuguese state-run institute for research on biological resources. It develops research in agricultural fields, veterinary, animal growth, marine biology and fishing. It provides scientific and technical support to its related sectors of activity.

== History ==
The National Agronomy and Fishing Investigation Institute (native official name: Instituto Nacional de Investigação Agrária e das Pescas) was its previous incarnation. In 2006, a decree (Decreto-Lei n.º 209/2006) created the Instituto Nacional dos Recursos Biológicos from the remains of the Instituto Nacional de Investigação Agrária (agricultural research), Instituto de Investigação das Pescas e do Mar (fishing and marine resources research) and the Laboratório Nacional de Investigação Veterinária (veterinary research).
