= SEAT =

Spanish automobile manufacturer

SEAT S.A.

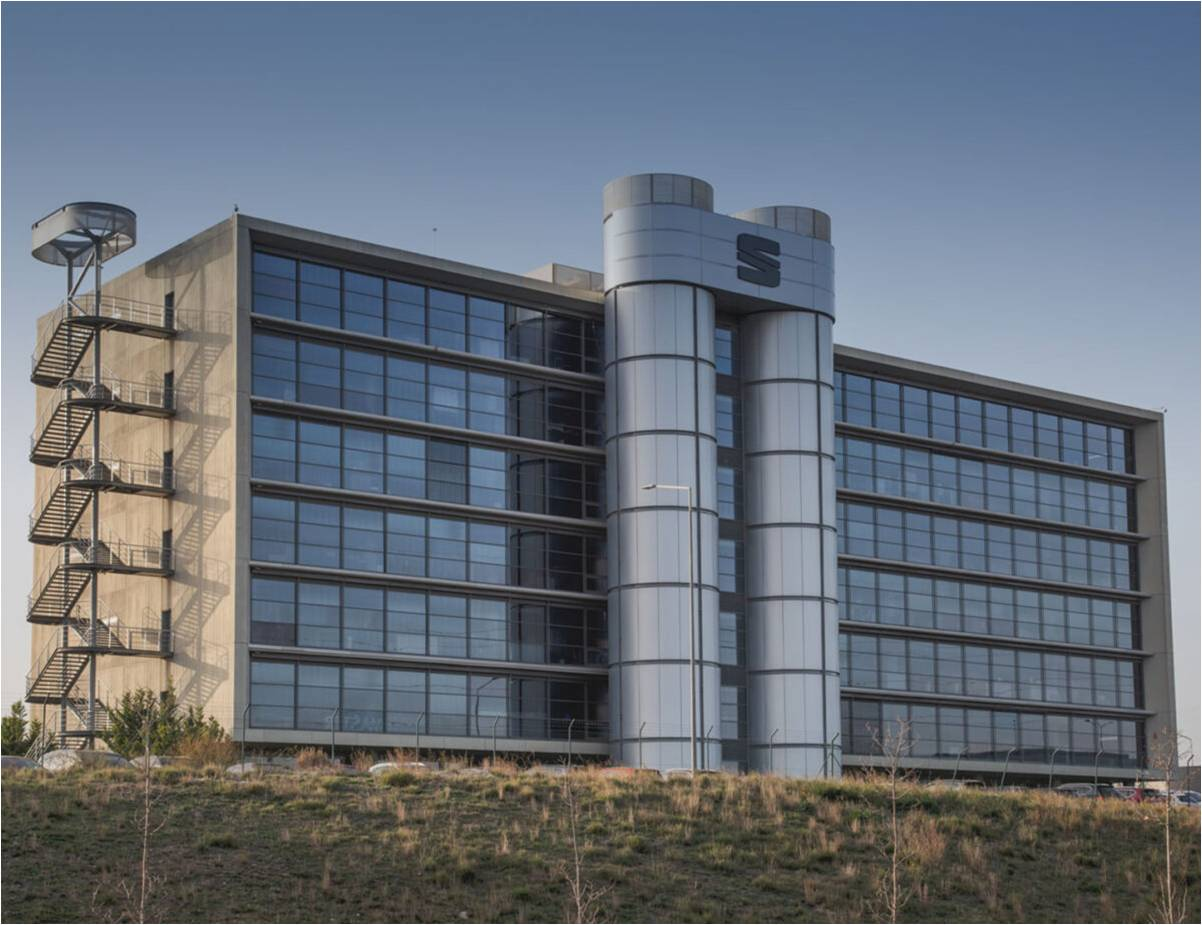
- Headquarters in Martorell, Spain
- Native name: Sociedad Española de Automóviles de Turismo (S.E.A.T.)
- Type: Subsidiary
- Industry: Automotive
- Founded: 9 May 1950; 76 years ago
- Founder: Instituto Nacional de Industria
- Headquarters: Martorell, Catalonia, Spain
- Area served: Europe, Middle East, Africa, Latin America (except Brazil and Argentina), and Singapore
- Key people: Markus Haupt (CEO)
- Products: Cars, electric vehicles, automotive parts
- Production output: ▲558,100 vehicles (2024) (incl. SEAT, Cupra)
- Brands: SEAT; Cupra
- Services: Design, manufacture, and distribution of SEAT cars and components
- Revenue: ▲€14.53 billion (2024)
- Net income: ▲€625 million (2023)
- Number of employees: 14,751 (2020)
- Parent: Volkswagen Group
- Divisions: Cupra Racing
- Website: seat.com

SEAT
- Product type: Cars
- Current owner: Volkswagen Group
- Produced by: SEAT S.A.
- Country: Spain
- Introduced: 1953; 73 years ago
- Related brands: Cupra

SEAT S.A. (English: /ˈseɪɑːt/; Spanish: [ˈse.at]; from Spanish Sociedad Española de Automóviles de Turismo, lit. 'Spanish Passenger Car Company') is a Spanish car manufacturer that sells its vehicles under the SEAT and Cupra brands. Founded on 9 May 1950, it was created as a joint venture between Spain's government-owned Instituto Nacional de Industria, which held a majority stake, Spanish private banks, and Fiat. After being listed as an independent automaker for 36 years, the Spanish government sold SEAT to the Volkswagen Group in 1986, and it remains a fully owned subsidiary of the group.

The headquarters of SEAT S.A. is located in Martorell, near Barcelona, at the company's industrial complex. Over 468,000 units were produced in 2020, with more than 427,000 cars exported to over 75 countries worldwide.

== History ==
=== Establishment ===
Spain is the world's eighth-largest manufacturer of automobiles. Its car market stands among the largest in Europe. This, however, has not always been the case; in the first half of the 20th century, Spain's economy was relatively underdeveloped compared to most other Western European countries and had a limited automobile market. In this period, car production was limited, with only a few low-volume local manufacturers catering mainly to the luxury end of the market, of which Hispano-Suiza was the most successful. Spain's limited market for mass-produced vehicles was taken over by foreign companies operating through subsidiaries that either imported cars or assembled cars from imported parts, depriving the country of the technological know-how and large investments needed for mass production. The situation greatly deteriorated with the Spanish Civil War from 1936 to 1939. Car demand collapsed not only due to the greatly reduced purchasing power of Spaniards caused by war devastation but also because the multinational subsidiaries either ceased operations or were severely stricken by the war and its aftermath.

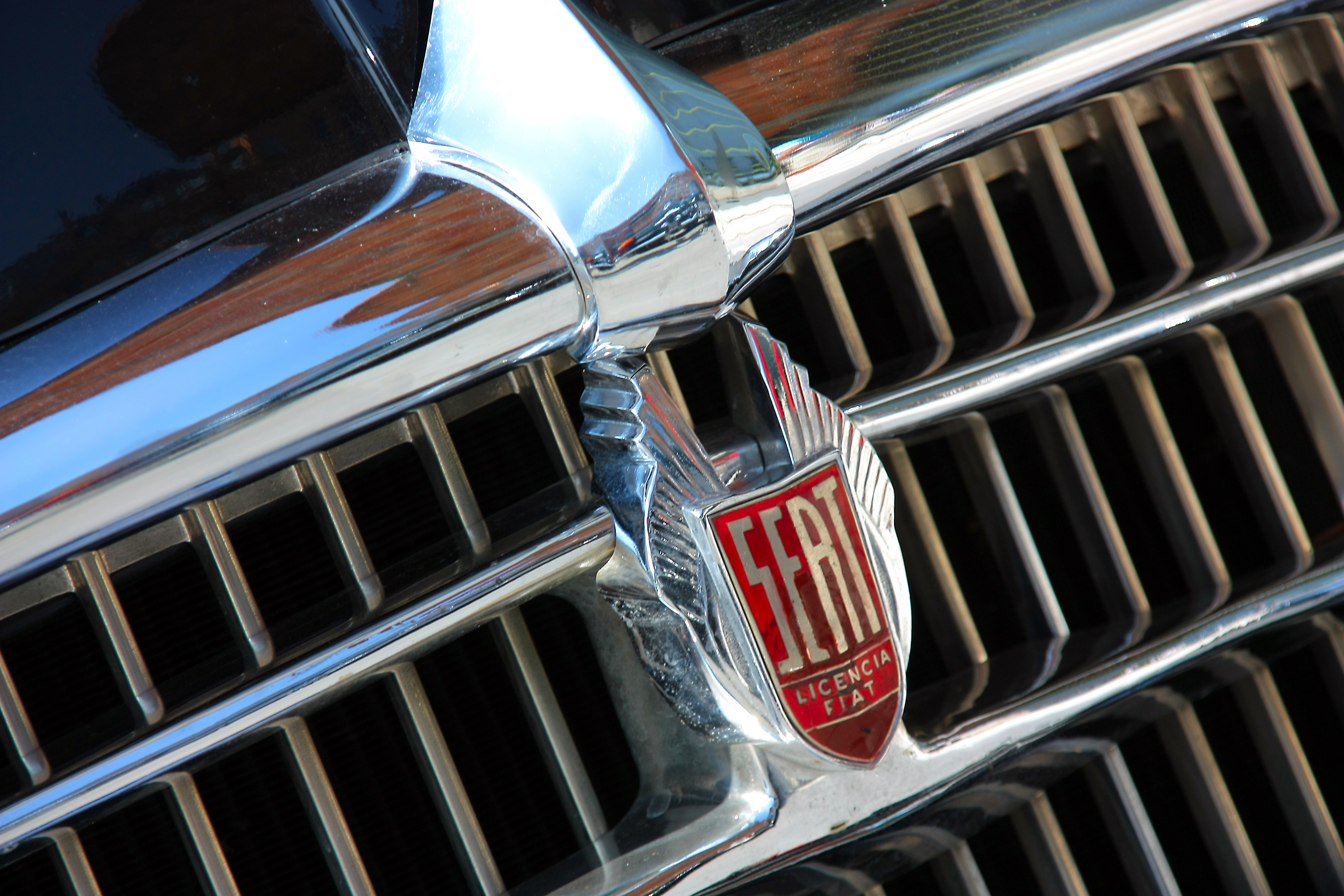
SEAT's first emblem on a car grill

The lack of interest shown by the foreign firms in the weakened post-civil war Spanish market opened an opportunity for local interests. SEAT dates its origins back to 22 June 1940, when the Spanish bank 'Banco Urquijo', with the support of a group of industrial companies, (Hispano-Suiza, Basconia, Duro-Felguera, S.E. de Construcción Naval, Euskalduna, S.E. de Construcciones Metálicas, Fundiciones Bolueta, Echevarría, etc.) founded the 'Sociedad Ibérica de Automóviles de Turismo' (S.I.A.T.) to establish Spain's own mass production car maker. The initial Banco Urquijo's project aimed at running the S.I.A.T. motor company as a fully private enterprise, but soon after 1941, the interventionist state holding company Instituto Nacional de Industria followed a decision taken by the Franco government on 3 January 1942. The goal for the new national car brand was not to be only another licensee car maker assembling foreign designs and parts in Spain, but of developing the whole manufacturing process from design to assembly within Spain. Because of the country's lack of expertise in automotive mass-production development, finding a foreign partner that would contribute technically and with its models in the early years in exchange for cash, shares, bonds, and royalties became the course of action. With the rest of Europe having entered World War II, and Spain itself in ruins from its civil war, the project was delayed but not abandoned due to its strategic importance.

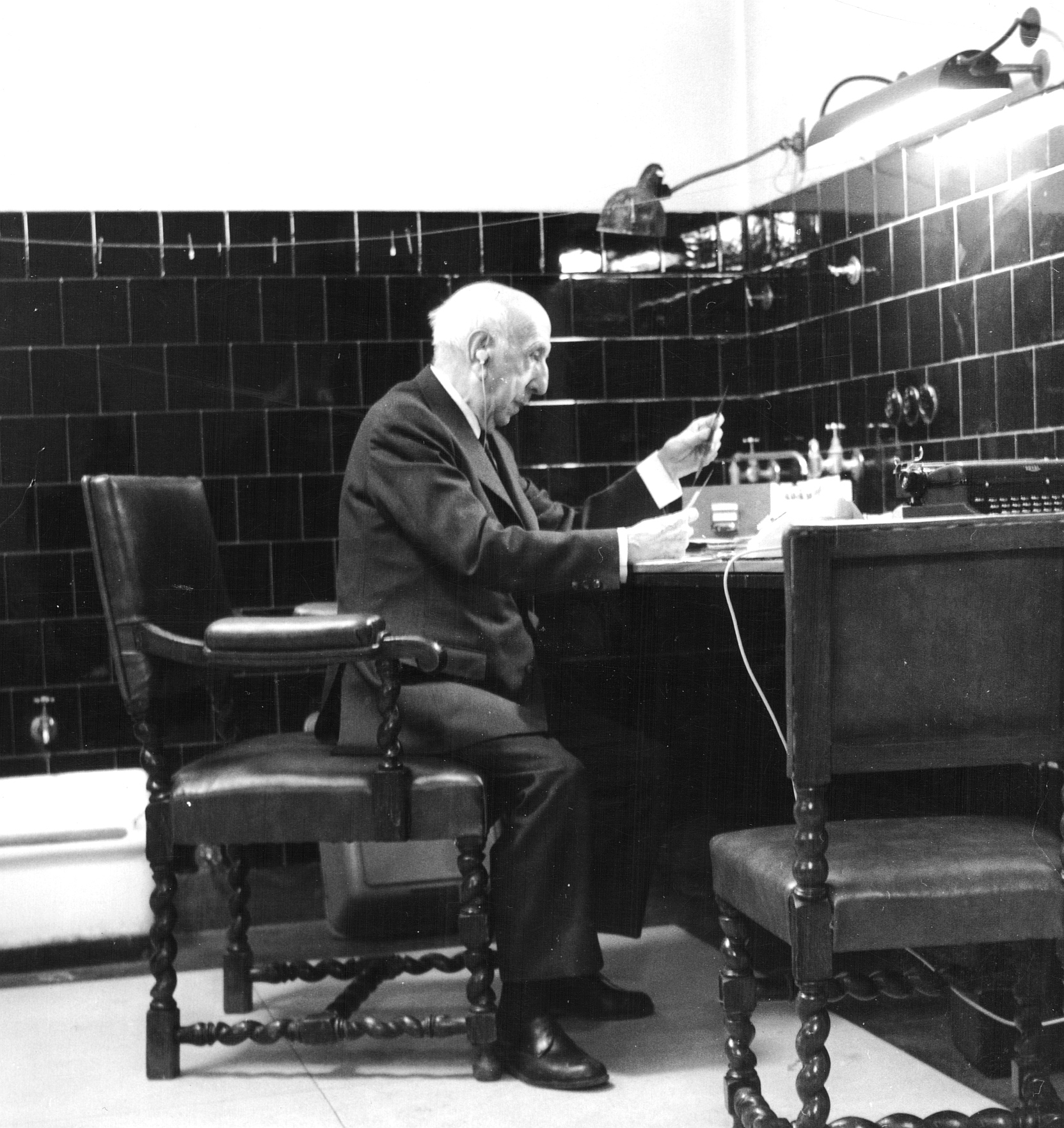
José Ortiz-Echagüe Puertas, SEAT's first president, was in 1976 made honorary president for life.

SEAT under its current name was founded on 9 May 1950, under the denomination 'Sociedad Española de Automóviles de Turismo, S.A.' (S.E.A.T.) by the Instituto Nacional de Industria (INI) with a starting capital of 600 million pesetas – equivalent today of almost 3.6 million euros – in the form of 600,000 shares of 1000 pesetas each, and in a time when the country needed remodeling the fundamental structures in its national economy, just after the end of World War II. The birth of SEAT came almost a year and a half after the Spanish government and six Spanish banks ('Banco Urquijo', 'Banco Español de Crédito (Banesto)', 'Banco de Bilbao', 'Banco de Vizcaya', 'Banco Hispano-Americano', and 'Banco Central') had signed on 26 October 1948, an alliance contract with the Italian car manufacturer Fiat to form a partnership with a foreign ally to bring to life Spain's major car manufacturer. The favoured bidders were Germany's Volkswagen and Italy's Fiat. Fiat's bid won for several reasons, including Fiat's prominence in Spain and the fact that the company established the short-lived 'Fiat Hispania' plant in Guadalajara, which was destroyed in the Spanish Civil War. Fiat's collaboration with the French company Simca proved Fiat's ability to manage complex international projects. Fiat's experience in the semiprotected car market in Italy was seen as the most easily transferable to the one in Spain, both of which had, at the time, customers of low incomes and limited markets for cars, as well as similar road conditions. In Italy, Fiat dominated the market for vehicles under 12 horsepower, which would initially be the main market segment in Spain. The relative economic isolation of World War II damaged Italy and made Fiat interested in opportunities outside Italy, meaning that the negotiations with the Italian manufacturer could prosper more easily in favour of Spanish interests than those from other countries. In 1947, the Banco Urquijo group revived the S.I.A.T. project. In the next year, the talks ended successfully with the signing of a three-part contract, with the understanding that the INI would hold a 51% controlling interest, as well as a ruling act in the new company preserving a focused approach of the enterprise in the 'national interest'. The Banco Urquijo group, although a minority shareholder, looked forward to assuming a leading role in the future as soon as the company was privatized. Partner carmaker Fiat was offered a 7% share in exchange for its technical assistance. This way, SEAT would not only be able to reinitiate the country's economic recovery as the largest employer in the 1960s and '70s but would also contribute to the industrialisation of a largely rural economy.

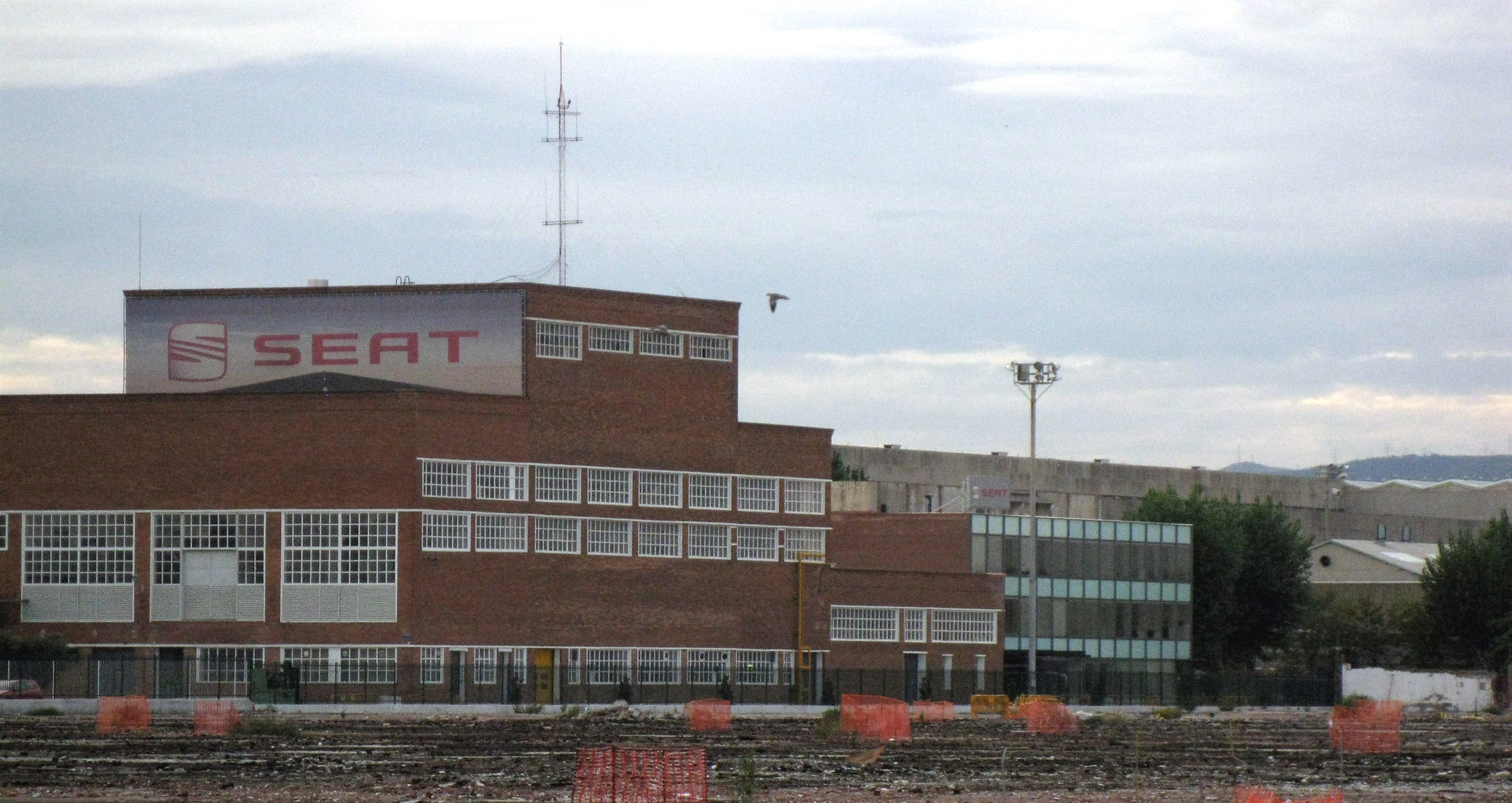
SEAT's Barcelona Zona Franca site and laboratories

Though initial thoughts were of locating in less-developed inland cities such as Valladolid and Burgos, the company decided the plant would be constructed in the duty-free zone area of the Port of Barcelona (Barcelona Zona Franca), which would offer better access to the Mediterranean shipping and the rest of Europe through rail and road connections across the nearby French border. Barcelona was a city with an industrial history that had built up expertise in complex industrial enterprises since the latter part of the 19th century; it was also the host location of many early historical Spanish carmakers, such as Hispano-Suiza and Elizalde, and subsidiaries of foreign carmakers, such as Ford Motor Ibérica and General Motors Peninsular. Being an enterprise of vital interest for the national economy and an investment opportunity for Fiat's expansion plans through the Iberian peninsula, SEAT benefitted from state tariff and tax exemptions and technical assistance from its foreign partner Fiat. The company's first president was the industrial and aeronautical engineer, pilot, and photographer José Ortiz-Echagüe Puertas, who came from the Spanish aircraft manufacturer Construcciones Aeronáuticas SA, where he had held the position of CEO, and who in 1976 was named the Honorary lifetime president of SEAT.

=== Partnership with Fiat ===
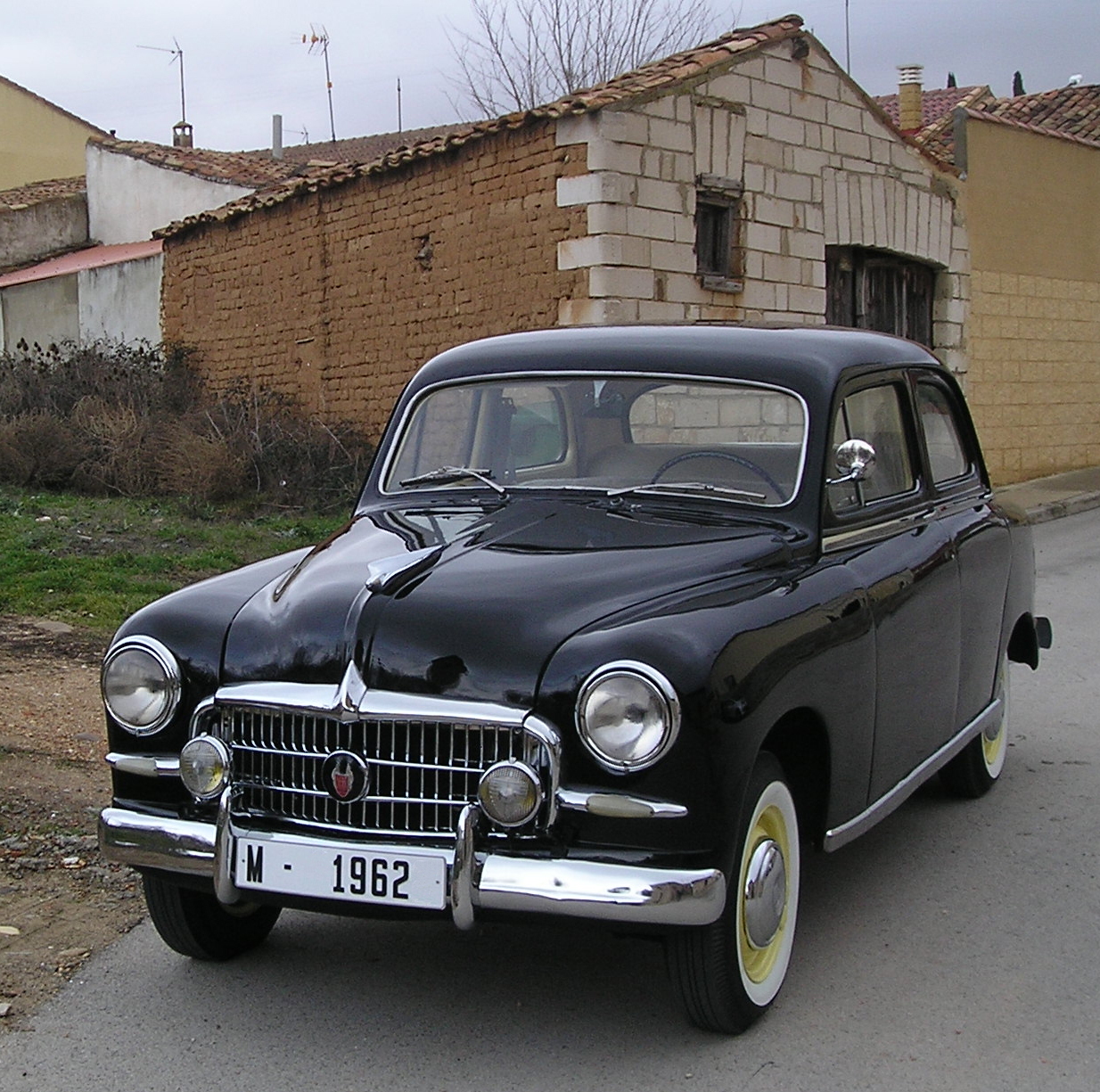
SEAT 1400, the first model produced by SEAT in 1953

The construction works for SEAT's Zona Franca plant began in 1950, and the opening day came three years later on 5 June 1953, while in the meantime since 1951, the Spanish marque was starting preparations for setting up almost from scratch an entire supplier industry background. The first car in the marque's history to be produced was a SEAT 1400 model that came off the production line on 13 November 1953, with license plate B-87.223. In the following few months, the plant's production output and workforce significantly increased together with the implementation of locally made components in the production process to limit imports from one part and from another part to push the development of the almost nonexistent Spanish supplier industry and meet SEAT's assigned key role as the national carmaker in restoring the Spanish economy of post–World War II Spain. By 1954, the use of Spanish-made parts had risen to 93% of the total, and the factory was officially opened the next year on 5 May 1955. Nevertheless, the impact on Spanish society could not be seen immediately since the first model launched by SEAT was considered a luxury car, so it was highly priced and still not affordable to the average Spanish consumer. Consequently, SEAT needed a second, more economical model to compete against simpler, inexpensive designs that appeared in the local market, like the Biscúter, which seemed to suit better the unwealthy customers looking for a personal means of transport in a suffering economy.

Until the time SEAT had the technical maturity and expertise to present its first self-developed model, the SEAT 1200 Sport in 1975, in its beginnings, the company had to manufacture either rebadged or restyled models borrowed from the range of its Italian partner Fiat Automobiles or even redeveloped them according to the needs of its range. However, the first example of a SEAT-exclusive derivative would arrive in September 1963 with the launch of the SEAT 800, a car developed in-house by SEAT with no equivalent model in Fiat's range based on the SEAT 600 as a stretched version with four doors.

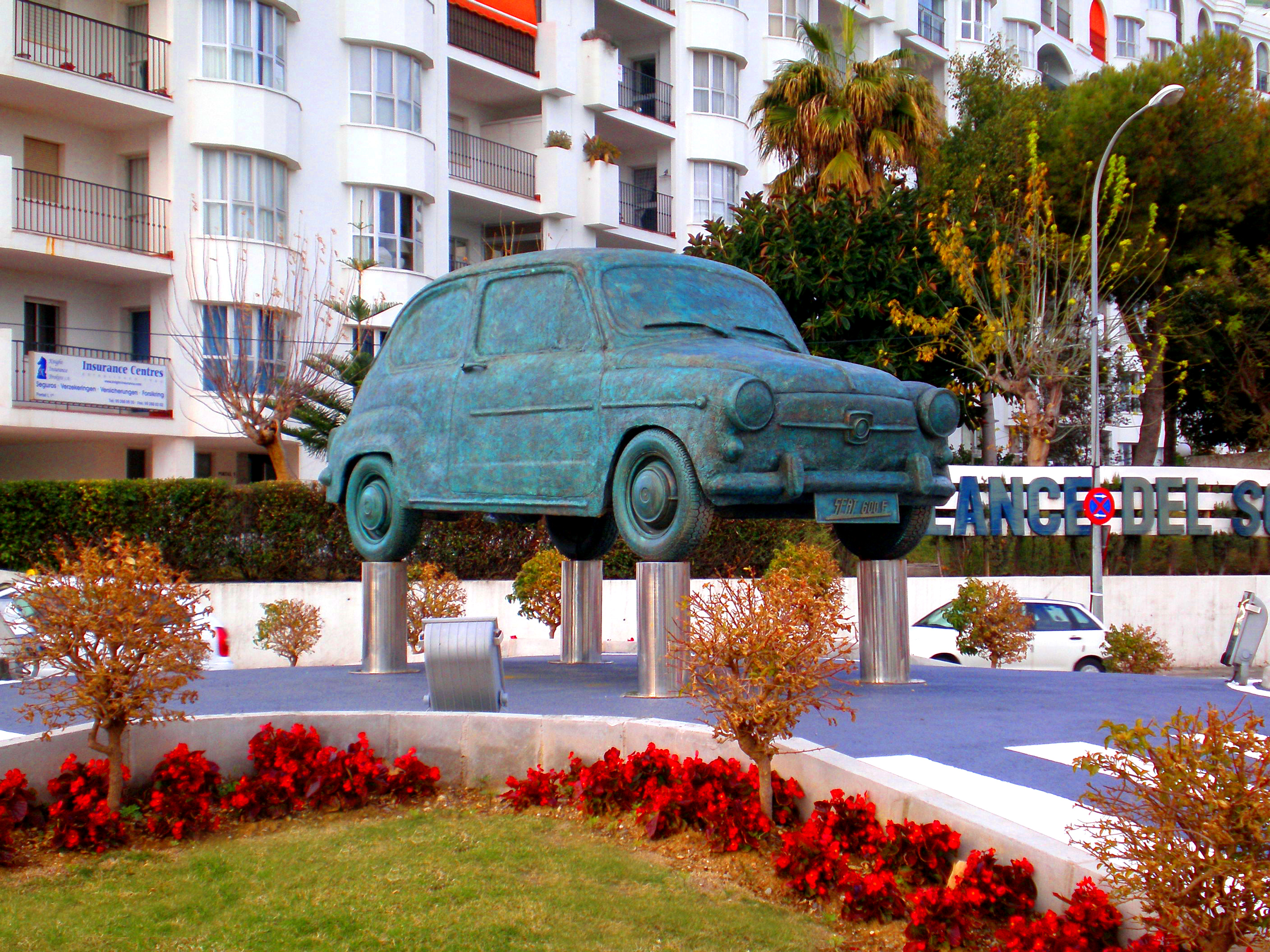
A monument in Spain for the SEAT 600, a symbol of the Spanish miracle

In 1957 SEAT founded the SEAT Training Centre in the greater Zona Franca plant area, an institution covering the training of qualified personnel and serving the needs of the automobile industry in specialized technical human resources. In that same year, the historical SEAT 600 was launched, which proved to be the crucial car that literally motorized Spain, being the first car for many Spanish families and becoming a symbol of the Spanish miracle.

As the annual production growth was hitting one record after another due to the heavy demand, the economies of scale permitted cutting costs and prices, subsequently renewing demand and boosting sales together with profits for SEAT. On 29 June 1964, the brand opened its new headquarters in Madrid, which hosted the firm's sole – up to 1972 – general administration offices. SEAT's plant manager was only in Barcelona until 1973 when SEAT settled another general director in Catalonia.

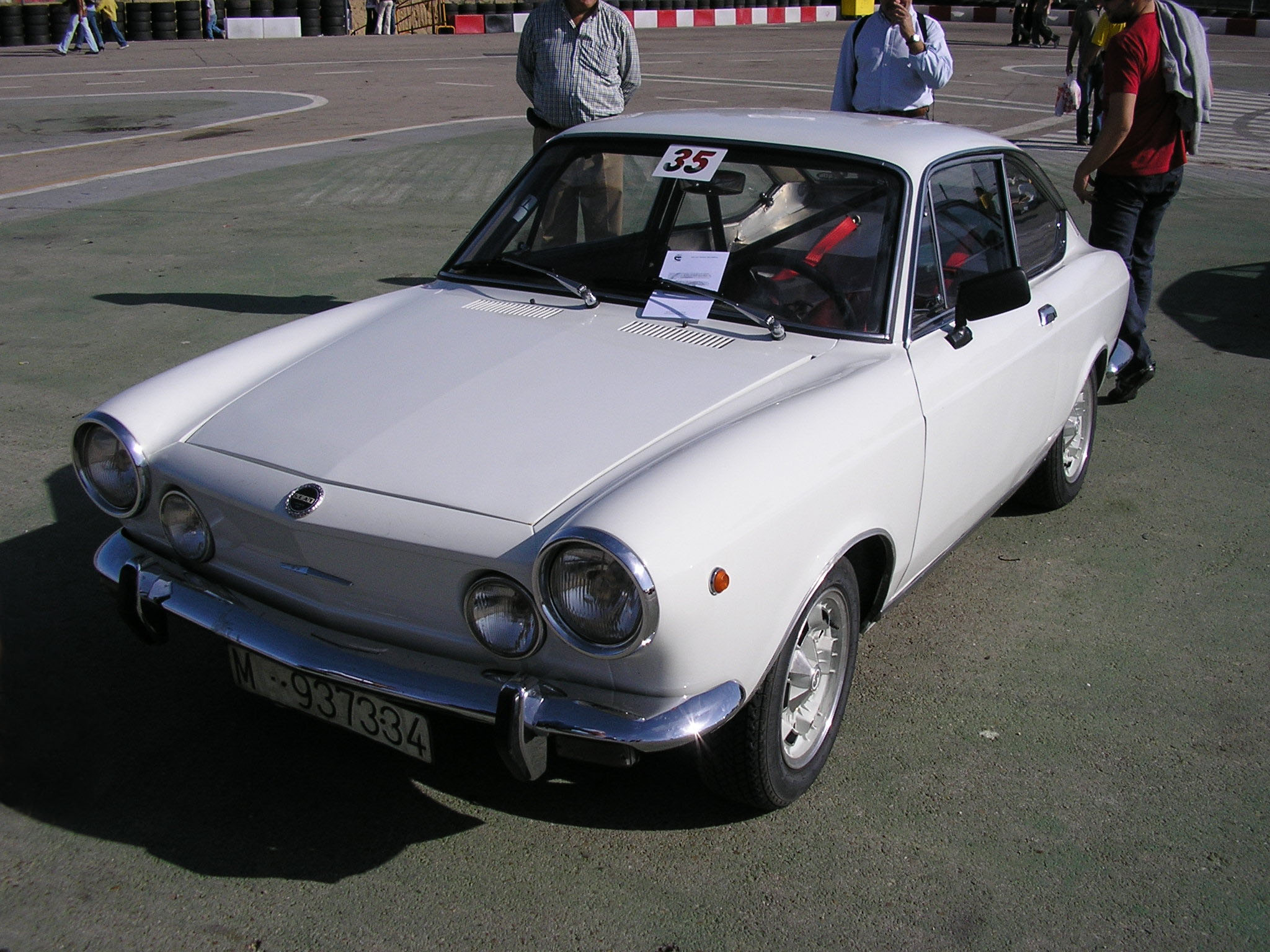
The SEAT 850 Sport, launched in 1967, was the first coupé model from SEAT.

In 1967, 14 years after producing cars for the domestic market, SEAT's success was signalled by its dominant position in Spain, ahead of its major competitors, i.e. 'FASA-Renault', 'Citroën-Hispania', Authi, and Barreiros, making SEAT Spain's largest automaker in sales numbers and a wholly localized production. In that year, an agreement between Fiat and the Spanish Ministry of Industry was reached to end the restrictions over exporting SEAT cars from Spain, a term of the original licensee contract agreed with Fiat in 1948. In exchange for that, Fiat would increase its holding in the company from 7% to 36%. At the same time, the share held by the government holding agency would be reduced from a controlling 51% to 32%. The six major Spanish banks took the remaining 32%, which decreased from their previous 42% share split equally into 7% parts owned by every single one. Although not a majority owner, Fiat now was seen to control the business: the deal also included various undertakings by Fiat to help in the growth of SEAT, and with the development of a new model (possibly the SEAT 133). On 6 December 1967, SEAT also founded its own customer financing company 'Financiera SEAT, S.A.' (Fiseat).

To produce its own research projects independently, on 16 November 1970, SEAT came in accordance with Fiat to start building separate infrastructures aimed at developing new technologies. In 1972, the brand arranged some provisional facilities for the site of the future technical centre in Martorell, and in 1973, it began construction work; this goal would come only until 1975 to be reached with the completion of the first phase in the construction of a facility designed by the Catalan architect Josep Antoni Coderch.

During the same period, the manufacturer continued to dominate the Spanish auto market, producing 282,698 cars – more than 58% of the Spanish production total – in 1971, despite the disruption that year caused by strikes and a serious flood at the coastally sited Barcelona plant. However, with just 81 cars per 1000 people, Spanish car sales were seen as ripe for further growth, and SEAT faced the prospect of increased competition with other major manufacturers contemplating the establishment or expansion of local production facilities in the still heavily protected Spanish car market.

In 1973, SEAT and Citroën-Hispania jointly contributed equal shares in founding the Vigo-located factory of Industrias Mecánicas de Galicia, SA (Indugasa) producing constant-velocity joints, essential components used in front-wheel drive cars, i.e. in a transmission layout the use of which was becoming more and more common at the time. This plant, which in the next years would supply parts not only to SEAT and Citroën-Hispania but also to Ford España, was meant to be transferred later in 1986 to the multinational company GKN.

In May 1975, after a request from the Spanish state authorities to ensure the rescue of the jobs for the workers in the Authi-owned factories, SEAT moved on talks with the parent company British Leyland Motor Corporation (BLMC) of the bankrupt Authi to take over the brand's operations in Spain, leaving aside GM's interest in it, which would otherwise open the path for the American automaker to enter the Spanish market, thus jeopardizing the relationship with Fiat. The talks ended in July 1975, when an agreement was announced between the two parties under which SEAT would acquire from BLMC the Authi brand along with its assets for 1,250 million pesetas. The imposed acquisition of the Landaben plant would also give up SEAT's plans to build a new facility in Zaragoza. Although the Authi supplier factory in Manresa was transferred to a company called Cometsa for 150 million pesetas, the Landaben plant in Pamplona remained under SEAT's ownership to continue production in February 1976 only of SEAT cars this time.

The 1970s were a decade of rising prosperity in Spain, which is reflected in the announcement in August 1976 that SEAT would commence local production of the Lancia Beta. Three years later, Beta production by SEAT indeed commenced at the company's recently acquired Pamplona plant, though only the coupe and HPE lift-back versions were included. The Spanish cars were fitted with a simplified suspension system and smaller engines than their Italian counterparts to qualify for a lower car tax rate.

In 1977, SEAT's leasing company Liseat was founded. In 1979, the Gearbox del Prat facility was set up as a specialised plant for producing gearboxes, gear mechanisms, and differentials in El Prat del Llobregat near Barcelona.

=== Dispute with Fiat ===
In the early 1980s, extensive discussions concerning funding and control took place between SEAT's major shareholder, the Spanish government, and Fiat Automobiles; SEAT needed major capital investment, which Fiat was not prepared to contribute, partially due to the oil crisis of the 1970s and also due to the uncertainty for Fiat's interests following the end of a protectionist policy against GM in Spain. The outcome, in 1982, was an end to the relationship with Fiat after nearly 30 years, a rather surprising decision despite the favourable perspectives for the Spanish economy, with Spain being in the anteroom of the European Economic Community since 1977.

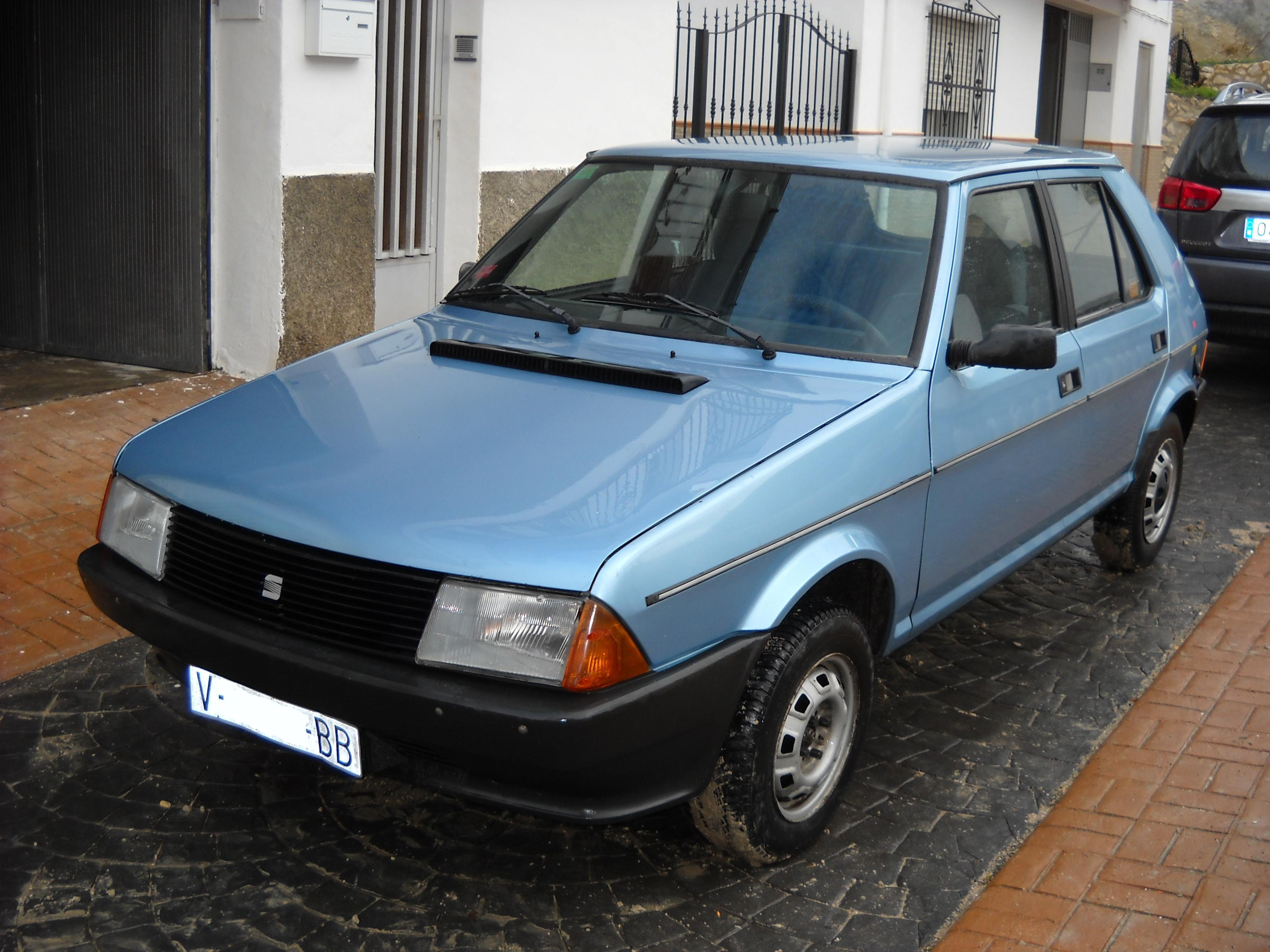
SEAT Ronda

The end of the cooperation with the Italian firm was marked by a change in SEAT's logo in 1982, and the first car under the new SEAT logo without Fiat's involvement appeared in the same year, the SEAT Ronda, styled by Rayton Fissore in collaboration with the technical centre in Martorell. The launch of this model sparked a lawsuit from Fiat against SEAT, as the former claimed the car was too similar to a car in Fiat's range, the Ritmo. In defence of SEAT, the then-president of SEAT, Juan Miguel Antoñanzas, showed a Ronda to the press with all the parts different from the Fiat Ritmo painted in bright yellow to highlight the differences. The case was eventually taken to the Arbitration Chamber of Paris, which in 1983 declared that differences between both cars were important enough not to consider the Ronda as a rebadged Ritmo, ending the dispute in favour of SEAT. Rumour at the time had it that Fiat was angry because the Ronda restyling was, in fact, too close to their own planned restyling for the Fiat Ritmo, which they had to scrap.

=== Volkswagen Group subsidiary ===
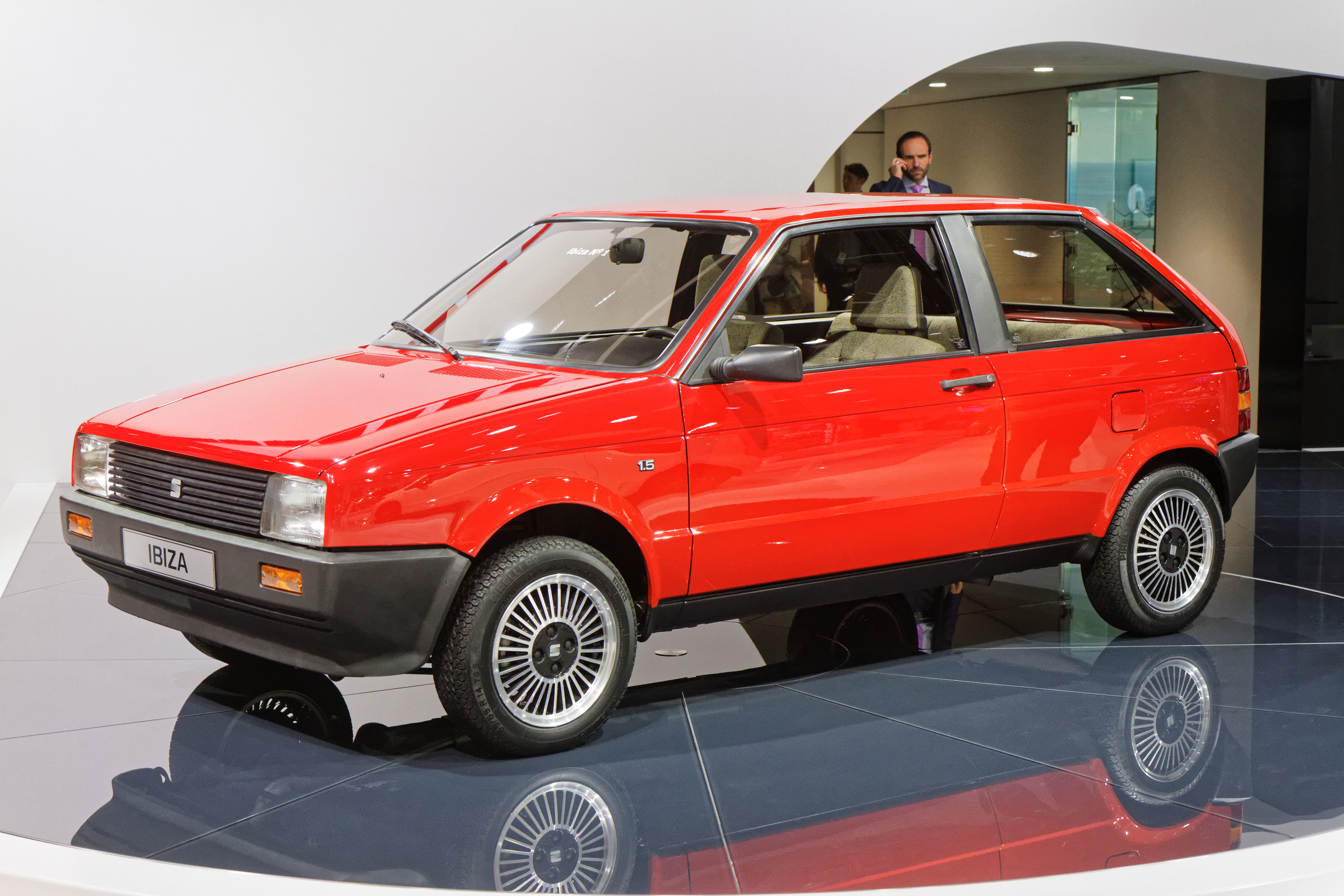
The SEAT Ibiza Mk1, launched in 1984, was the first model developed by SEAT as an independent company, together with Porsche and Karmann.

In 1982, Carl Hahn, who had just assumed responsibility as the chairman of the Volkswagenwerk AG (Volkswagen Group), examined the opportunity of approaching SEAT after Fiat's withdrawal in his plan to expand the Volkswagen Group's operations out of Germany and turning the German group into a global force. It also followed the precedent set by other global manufacturers (such as Ford in Valencia and General Motors in Zaragoza) in setting up manufacturing operations in Spain. However, the Spanish authorities had already started talks with other foreign firms, such as Toyota, Nissan and Mitsubishi to choose a strong partner for SEAT. Hahn's interest soon resulted in industrial and commercial cooperation, as well as a license agreement with SEAT on 30 September 1982, for the production in Spain of the Volkswagen Passat-Santana and Polo-Derby models in SEAT's Zona Franca and Landaben factories, respectively – having thus as an effect on 29 April 1983, the ending of the SEAT Panda's production at the Landaben assembly lines due to the need of adapting this plant to the production of the VW Polo – and eventually a partnership agreement was signed on 16 June 1983, between the two parties being represented by the president of SEAT Juan Miguel Antoñanzas and Carl Hahn on behalf of the Volkswagenwerk AG. SEAT also gained the rights to distribute Volkswagens in Spain.

SEAT launched its new Ibiza, a Giugiaro-styled hatchback, which made use of System Porsche engines and also featured underpinnings from the Fiat Ritmo/Strada, in 1984. It also formed the basis of the Málaga, a four-door family saloon. SEAT began expanding into markets beyond Spain's borders, including the United Kingdom, where it began selling cars in the autumn of 1985.

On 17 June 1986, after purchasing the 51% majority stake of SEAT and its share increased to 75% on 23 December of the same year, the Volkswagen Group became the major shareholder of SEAT. On 18 December 1990, the Volkswagen Group bought the remaining 25% of the company, thus making SEAT the first non-German wholly-owned subsidiary of the group. Fulfilling Hahn's expectations, SEAT not only made a profit two years after Volkswagen bought a majority of its stock but also provided a low-cost manufacturing outlet for other VW models, contributing up to 15.2% of the VW group's total output in 1989, as well as an opportunity to enter the relatively unexploited (at that time) Spanish market under the SEAT, VW, and Audi names.

The gathering of the brand's main infrastructures in the greater Martorell plant area has taken place in a long process beginning back in 1975 with the opening of the SEAT technical centre, but only in 1989 was a decision made to start building a new main assembly facility next to the technical centre in Martorell, replacing the old one in Zona Franca. In that same year, the translocation of SEAT's Madrid administration offices to Barcelona began with the sale of two of the brand's assets in La Castellana to be completed in 1991 with the definitive installation of SEAT's headquarters in the Catalonia region.

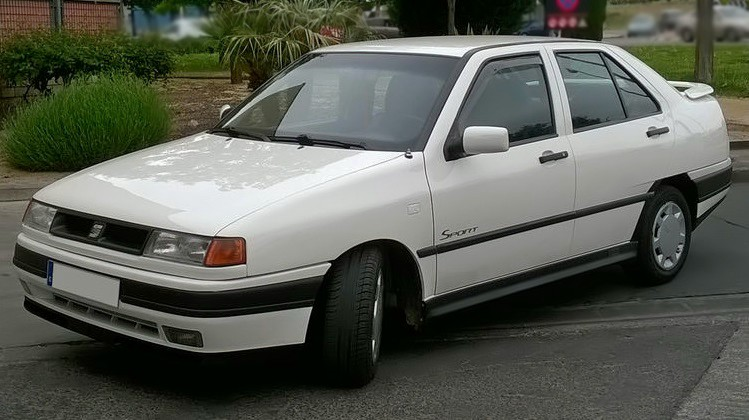
The SEAT Toledo Mk1, launched in 1991, was the first model fully developed under Volkswagen Group's ownership.

The centralisation of the management, design, research and production facilities localised around the plant site was meant to serve the aim of optimising the development of new models. On 22 February 1993, King Juan Carlos of Spain and the newly elected chairman of the Volkswagen Group Ferdinand Piëch inaugurated the Martorell plant, one of the most modern and efficient car plants in Europe, using the just-in-time process with its suppliers' site located only 2.5 km away. The first cars that rolled out of the Martorell plant lines were the SEAT Ibiza Mk2 and its saloon version, the SEAT Córdoba Mk1. The new Ibiza was a huge success for SEAT, greatly expanding its market share, particularly in export markets.

The original planning in October 1993 to close the emblematic Zona Franca assembly plant as soon as the production of vehicles could be transferred to the more efficient Martorell plant was overturned after an arrangement between the Spanish authorities and the Volkswagen Group, according to which the Zona Franca site would continue its operations, but would be gradually turned into a site with an auxiliary role in the production process (foundry, press shop, etc.). Meanwhile, on 23 December 1993, the 'Fábrica Navarra de Automóviles, S.A. was founded as a new company to hold the management of the Landaben factory, separating any ties to SEAT in production matters, with its shares being transferred to Volkswagen in June 1994 over which, however, SEAT would regain ownership four years later in 1998.

In 1994, the design centre in Sitges – the Spanish coastal town south of Barcelona – and the suppliers' park in Zona Franca were also inaugurated, and in the winter of the same year, SEAT's financing and leasing companies – Fiseat and Liseat – were sold to Volkswagen Financial Services AG. In 1994, SEAT, in collaboration with Suzuki, manufactured a five-door prototype model of a city car, internally named Rosé, aiming to replace with it the Marbella in its range, but this model never made it through to production.

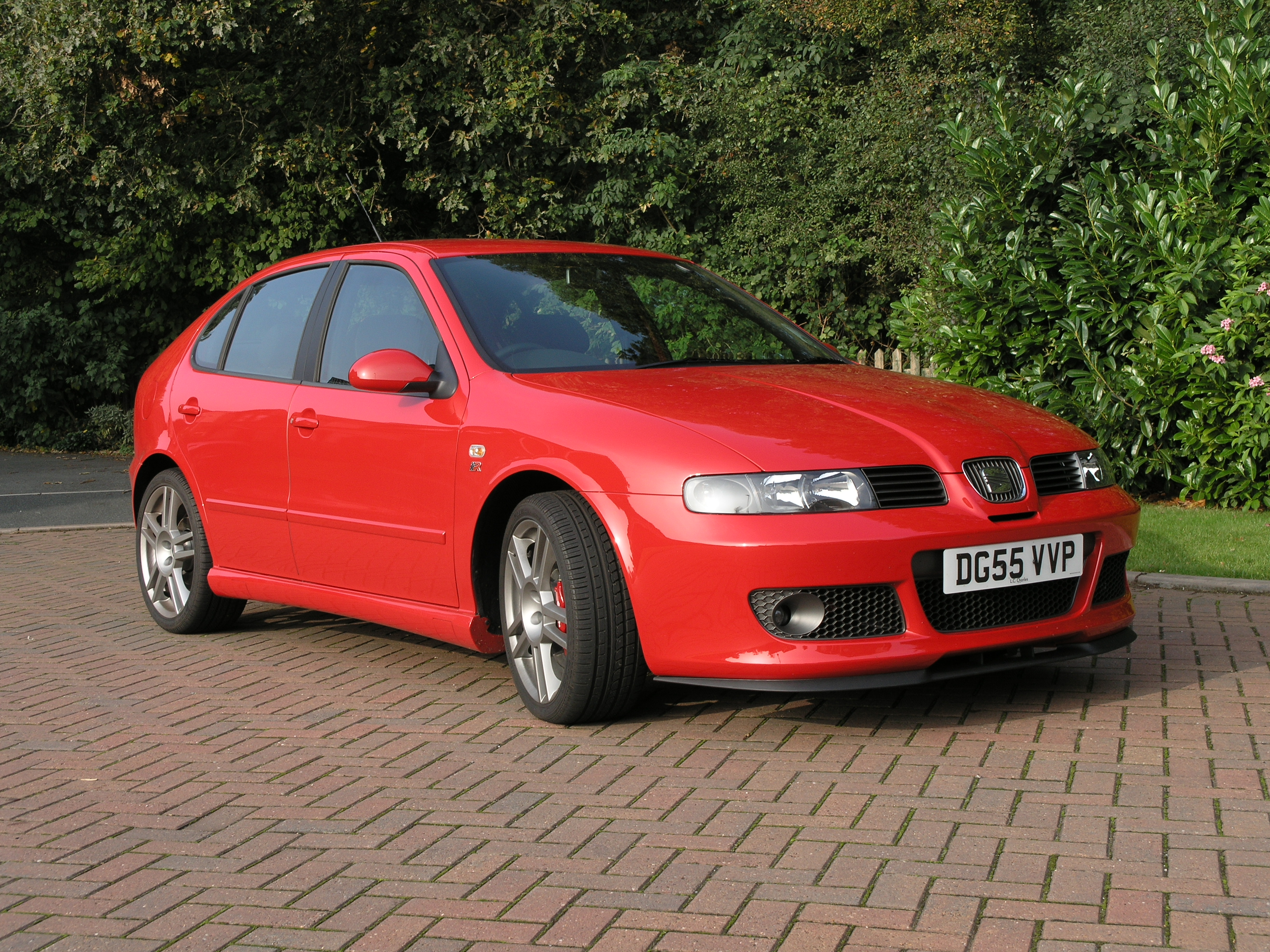
SEAT León Mk1 Cupra R

The first time a SEAT model was manufactured out of Spain was in 1996, with the production of the SEAT Alhambra Mk1 in the Palmela AutoEuropa plant in Portugal. Also, in January 1997, a non-Spanish descendant, the Belgian Pierre-Alain de Smedt, was appointed SEAT's chairman for the first time. The SEAT Arosa, a three-door city hatchback, was launched in 1997, effectively replacing the Marbella, SEAT's version of the Fiat Panda, which had been in production since the early 1980s.

On 7 April 1998, the Zona Franca plant marked the end of the production lifecycle of the Marbella model, signalling a historical moment for SEAT with the end of vehicle production in SEAT's oldest factory, which opened in 1953; ever since the Zona Franca plant has produced components and parts to be assembled in other locations. It also signalled the demise of SEAT's last Fiat-based model.

In March 1999, at the Geneva Motor Show, SEAT presented a modern, stylised logo, more rounded than the last one and using the silver colour on a red background, instead of the previous blue, symbolising respectively the rational and the emotional. This came shortly after the launch of the second-generation Toledo which used it as a badge and shortly before the launch of the Toledo-based Leon hatchback.

The "auto emoción" slogan was presented in September 2000, reflecting the brand's new youthful and sporty corporate identity, while SEAT Sport, apart from its motorsport activities, would undertake the responsibility of developing SEAT's high-performance vehicles.

On 1 July 2000, Bernd Pischetsrieder, the former CEO of BMW, was appointed to head SEAT. In the spring of 2002, as Pischetsrieder was commissioned to chair the entire Volkswagen Group, he gave way to his German compatriot Andreas Schleef on 7 March 2002.

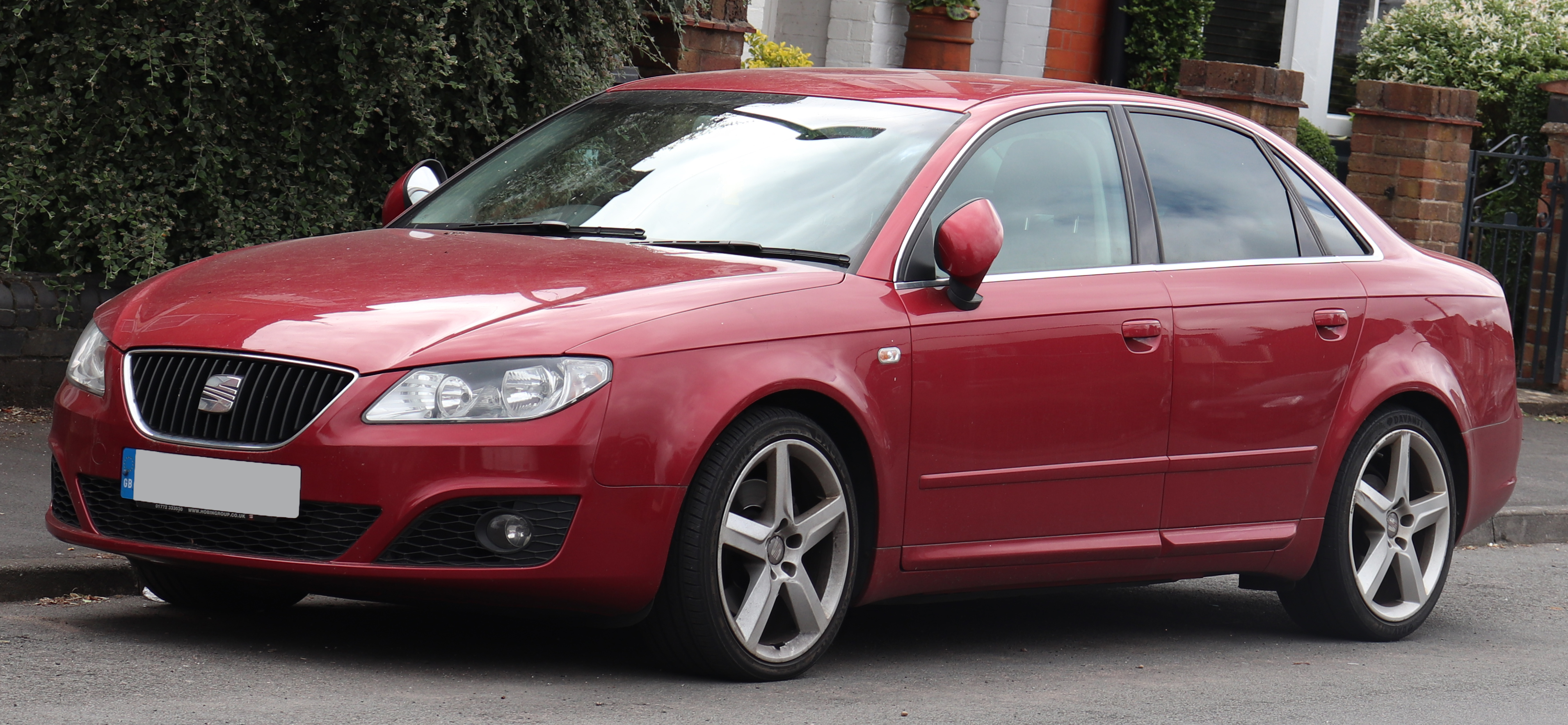
SEAT Exeo, a rebadged Audi A4 (B7), was the flagship model.

From 2002 to 2007, SEAT formed part of the Audi Brand Group, the Volkswagen Group's automotive subdivision, consisting of Audi, SEAT and Lamborghini, which was focused on more sporty values, with the marque's product vehicles and performance being under the responsibility of the Audi brand.

In 2006, the new SEAT corporate head office was opened in Martorell and the Martorell SEAT Design Centre superseded the Volkswagen Group Design Centre Europe at Sitges, which previously hosted the design facility jointly owned by SEAT, Volkswagen, and Audi, as on 23 February of the same year, an agreement over the transfer of the installations of the latter to the City of Sitges was closed, with the Martorell's Design Centre official opening eventually taking place on 30 December 2007.

On 12 January 2007, the inauguration of the building of the SEAT Service Centre next to the southern entrance of the Martorell factory was held, the department focused on technical support, after-sales and marketing purposes, and covering the feedback and the relationship of the brand with the customers and its worldwide network. In January 2007, the operation of the SEAT Prototypes Centre of Development located in the heart of the Martorell industrial complex began, a facility inaugurated on 16 July of the same year, bringing together activities related to the virtual and physical preproduction processes of new models (prototyping, modelling, pilot product development, and series analysis), thus shortening development times for prototypes and preproduction vehicles, as well as saving costs with the use of modern technologies such as virtual simulation.

SEAT entered a clemency program revealing to the Spanish National Commission on Markets and Competition the anti-competitive sharing of sales and repair information among car builders and sellers in Spain controlling 91% of the market between 2006 and 2013. Thus SEAT and the companies in its group avoided the 2015 sanctions.

In March 2026, SEAT announced it will cease selling the Seat Ateca and Cupra Ateca in the UK, with the company saying the decision reflecting local market decisions.

== Leadership ==
- José Ortiz Echagüe (1950–1967)
- Juan Sánchez Cortés (1967–1977)
- Juan Miguel Antoñanzas Pérez-Egea (1977–1983)
- Juan Antonio Díaz Álvarez (1984–1993)
- Peter Walzer (1993)
- Juan Llorens Carrió (1993–1996)
- Pierre-Alain de Smedt (1997–1999)
- Bruno Adelt (1999–2000)
- Bernd Pischetsrieder (2000–2002)
- Andreas Schleef (2002–2006)
- Eric Schmitt (2006–2009)
- James Muir (2009–2013)
- Jürgen Stackmann (2013–2015)
- Luca de Meo (2015–2020)
- Carsten Isensee (2020)
- Wayne Griffths (2020–2025)
- Markus Haupt (2025–present)

== Facilities ==
=== Martorell ===
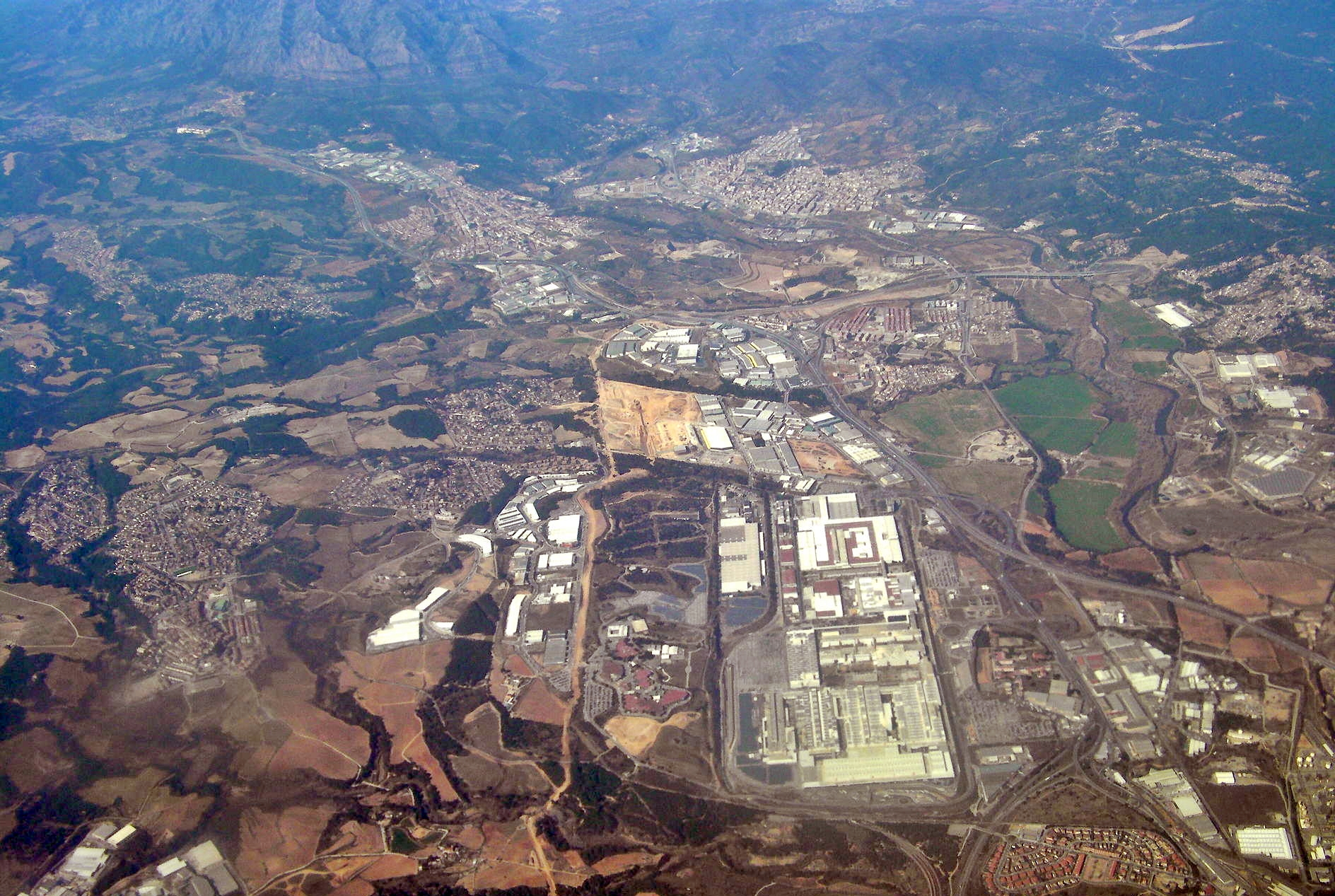
SEAT's industrial complex in Martorell

The headquarters and main manufacturing facilities of the company are located in Martorell, an industrial town approximately 30 km northwest of Barcelona, with an annual production capacity of around 500,000 units. On 22 February 1993, King Juan Carlos of Spain inaugurated this plant, which became the main plant of SEAT and was accompanied by its assembly plant at the coast in Barcelona's free port zone (Zona Franca). There is a rail link connecting SEAT's Martorell and Zona Franca facilities, which facilitates the transportation of vehicles and parts between the two locations.

The Martorell industrial complex houses numerous facilities, including Cupra Racing (formerly SEAT Sport), SEAT's Technical Center, Research and Development Center (R&D), Design Center, Prototypes Centre of Development, SEAT Service Center, which includes the After-Sales Service and Customer Services divisions, as well as the Catalunya Motor dealership, and the Genuine Parts Centre for SEAT, Volkswagen, Audi, and Škoda brands. The factory in Martorell can sometimes assist the former SEAT plant in Pamplona, which is now owned by Volkswagen-Audi-Espana, S.A.

The models produced at Martorell includes: Arona, Formentor, Ibiza, Leon, Leon Sportstourer and Audi A1.

- SEAT Technical Centre, located in Martorell, is focused on R&D. More than 1,294 people work there. In that centre, SEAT fully develops new vehicles. The centre covers a surface area of 200,000 m^{2}. They use virtual reality technologies in order to design the “new SEAT” cars.
- SEAT Design Center: it officially opened in 2007 and is located within the SEAT Technical Center. This facility brings the entire design process together. As of 2020, 100 people work there.
- Prototype Development Centre (PDC) was inaugurated in 2007 and is one of SEAT's main projects. It consolidates the activities related to the initial phases of the design and development of a new model. It brings together the knowledge, personnel and resources of the Prototype departments of the SEAT Technical Centre and the Pilot Workshop of Process Engineering in Martorell under one roof.
- Spare Parts Centre is an area with 75,000 m^{2} that distributes parts and components to SEAT, Volkswagen, Audi and Škoda dealers in Spain, to SEAT dealers in Portugal and also to SEAT importers all over the world.
- SEAT Service: The After-Sales Service, SEAT Technical Training Centre and Catalunya Motor dealership. This facility covers a surface area of 8,000 m^{2}. As of 2020, the workforce is 170 employees.
- Cupra Racing (former SEAT Sport): this facility covers a surface area of 16,000 m^{2} and is close to the manufacturing plant and the SEAT Technical Centre in Martorell. This centre is where SEAT adds sporty finishes to the SEAT range and prepares different competition models, such as the Cupra León Competition or the Cupra e-Racer.

=== Zona Franca ===
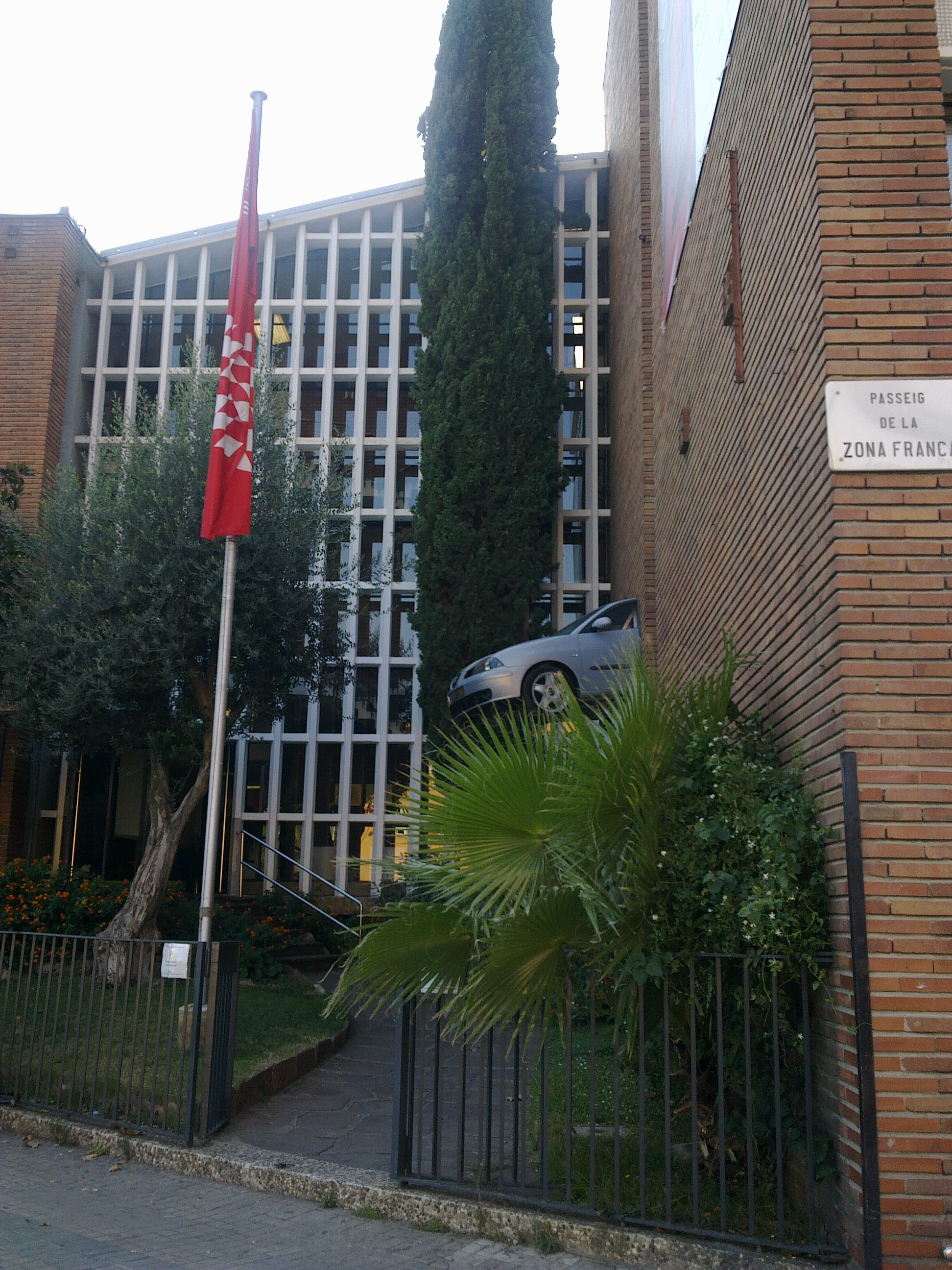
SEAT's Training Centre in Barcelona's Zona Franca

SEAT's factory in Barcelona's Zona Franca started its activities in 1953 and was the production facility where the first SEAT models such as the SEAT 1400 and the 600 were built. In 1993, the car production began to get transferred to the new Martorell plant, and since then, the Barcelona factory has been producing parts such as doors, roofs, fenders and chassis.

80% of the production of the parts for the MQB A0, the compact modular platform of the Volkswagen Group on which the Ibiza and Arona are based, is carried out in these facilities, as well as most of the stamped parts for all other SEAT models. The development and assembly facilities are some of the newest within the Volkswagen Group, with the ability to produce cars not only for its own brand but also for other Volkswagen Group brands, such as Volkswagen and Audi. For example, the development and design of several Audi models (e.g. the Audi A1, the Audi A3 Sportback, the Audi Q5, etc.) and also several Audi development projects took place there.

This plant is an industry benchmark, as it features elements such as the virtual simulation of the PXL press, 3D printing in the maintenance workshop, the automatic shifting between sealing tips of the robots in the body shop, and the automation of the logistics flow through automated guided vehicles.

The Barcelona Zona Franca site includes the SEAT Training Centre, the Zona Franca Press Shop factory, producing stamped body parts, and the Barcelona Gearbox del Prat plant, producing gearboxes not only for SEAT but also for other Volkswagen Group marques (Volkswagen, Audi, and Škoda); the latter plant was awarded the Volkswagen Excellence Award in 2009 by the Volkswagen Group for high-quality production process and product.

=== Other manufacturing plants ===
Another plant owned directly by SEAT from 1975 was the Landaben plant in Pamplona, but in December 1993 its ownership was transferred to the Volkswagen Group subsidiary "Volkswagen-Audi-Espana, S.A.", and the site today is producing Volkswagen cars in Spain. However, SEAT's Martorell site still provides support to Volkswagen's operations in the Pamplona plant when necessary, as it did after a serious fire in the paint shop in the Landaben VW plant in April 2007.

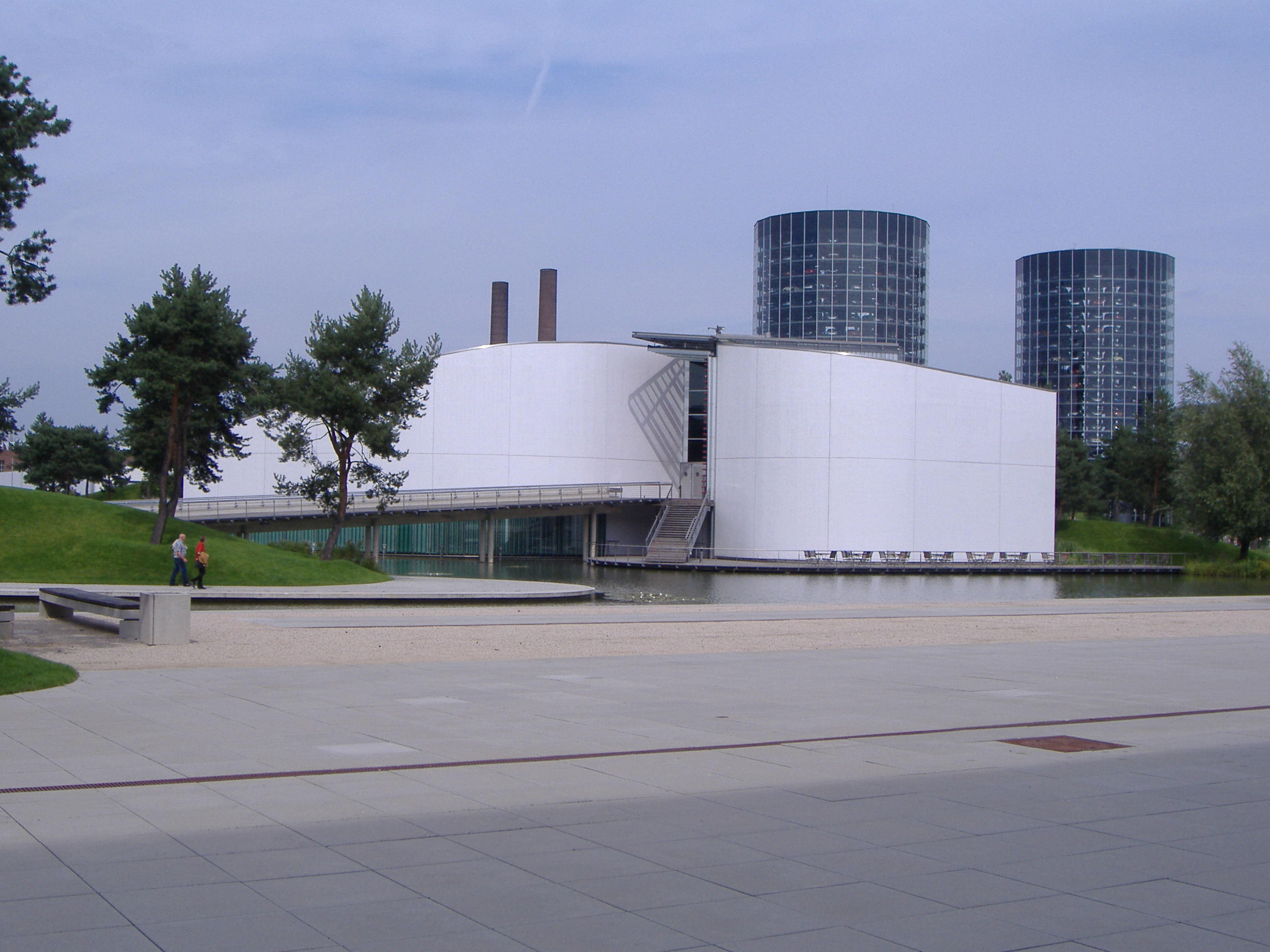
SEAT's Pavilion at Autostadt, Wolfsburg

Factories of the Volkswagen Group currently producing SEAT models also include the Bratislava site in Slovakia, the Volkswagen Zwickau-Mosel Plant in Zwickau, Germany (where the Cupra Born EV model is produced alongside the Volkswagen ID.3 Electric vehicle); the AutoEuropa factory in Palmela, Portugal, and Wolfsburg in Germany. Since 2016, SEAT also holds a museum in the Zona Franca's 'Nave A122' site, which hosts all production and prototype models ever presented by SEAT together with some special or limited edition vehicles with historical value for the brand and the automotive history of Spain.

Among SEAT's subsidiaries, the SEAT Deutschland GmbH subsidiary company is based in Mörfelden-Walldorf, Germany, and apart from its commercial activities, has the further responsibility of operating SEAT's electronic platform, the SEAT IT Services Network. In Wolfsburg, Germany, in the middle of a lake inside the Autostadt, the Volkswagen Group's corporate theme park, is SEAT's thematic pavilion, one of the largest pavilions in the park.

=== Other company facilities ===
- Casa SEAT: is a benchmark urban mobility promotional lab and was inaugurated in June 2020. It is located in Passeig de Gràcia in Barcelona and is SEAT MÓ's headquarters.
- SEAT: CODE (Center of Digital Excellence) is the software development centre. Since its establishment in 2019, it has led the company's digital transformation and created digital solutions to boost SEAT, Cupra and SEAT MÓ. In July 2020, this centre inaugurated its headquarters in Barcelona.
- SEAT's dealers: Besides selling SEAT and Cupra, some also offer second-hand vehicles or KM0 under the company DasWeltAuto, belonging to the Volkswagen Group. Many dealers also offer maintenance, parts, supplies and repair of the models. Outside Spain, SEAT has distributors in more than 70 countries.
- SEAT Componentes produces gearboxes for SEAT, Volkswagen, Audi and Škoda in its factory in El Prat de Llobregat (Barcelona). It was founded in 1979; the facilities cover more than 150,000 square meters and have a manufacturing capacity of up to 3,500 gearboxes daily, in a complete process that goes from the foundry to assembling and quality control. In 2020 this facility had more than 1,000 employees and produced two different gearbox models: the MQ200 and the new MQ281. Their combined maximum capacity is 800 thousand gearboxes per year.

== Presence in different markets ==
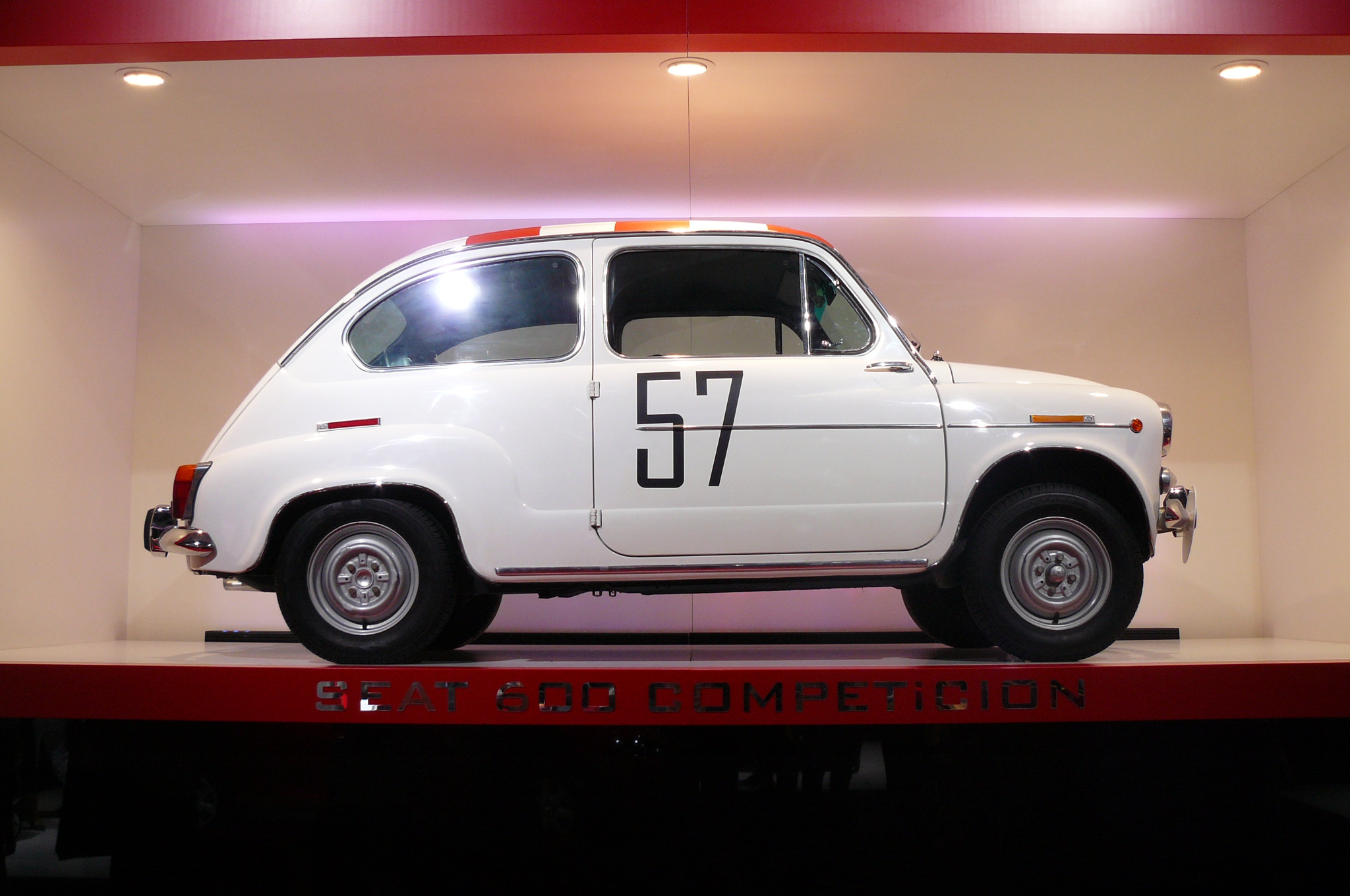
SEAT 600, the first model exported by SEAT in 1965 to Colombia.

In its more-than-70 year history, it was only during the period from 1953 to 1965 that the firm produced cars exclusively for the domestic Spanish market. In 1965, in a rather symbolic move, the company exported some 150 units of its SEAT 600 model (licensed version of the Fiat 600) destined for Colombia by air freight for the first time, until two years later, in 1967, SEAT reached a deal over the renegotiation of its license contract with Fiat that allowed the Spanish firm to form an international distribution network for its cars and thereafter start its export operations to more than 12 countries, entering the export market in 1969. Until the early 1980s, however, most SEAT exports were sold with Fiat badging. As a response to SEAT's bid for independence, Fiat committed themselves to sell 200,000 SEAT-built cars a year from 1981, compared to 120,000 the year before. At the end of 1983, just after SEAT had won its legal battle with Fiat, a quarter of the production went to Egypt and Latin America. In Europe, they were represented in West Germany, Belgium, France, Italy, Austria, and Greece. The UK, Ireland, and various Scandinavian markets were planned to be added in 1984. This was despite the company only being able to export the Ronda, with the Fura to follow. The exponential growth in exports in the '70s happened under the leadership of Juan Sánchez Cortés and the export director José María García-Courel.

To date, the company has launched its models in more than 70 countries worldwide in accordance with the development policies of the Volkswagen Group, with almost three-quarters of its annual production representing exports for the markets out of Spain. Its core market remains Europe, while the most successful market outside of Europe in sales for SEAT is currently Mexico, where the company has a dealer presence in 27 Mexican states.

In Europe, the brand has been launched in almost 40 countries across the continent. SEAT today also sells its cars in 11 countries in Asia, mostly in the Middle East and the Arabian Peninsula, in 16 countries in the Americas, including North America, the Caribbean, Central America, and South America, and finally Africa, mainly in North Africa. Some of its cars have been sold outside Europe, branded as Volkswagens, such as the SEAT Ibiza hatchback, known in South Africa as the Volkswagen Polo Playa, the SEAT Inca panel van as the Volkswagen Caddy, or the SEAT Córdoba, also known as the Volkswagen Polo Classic.

As of 2012, SEAT was planning to expand into the Chinese market, first with Spanish-produced models, followed later in a second phase by the local assembly of SEAT models in China.

SEAT's further expansion plans in more markets outside of Europe have yet to be realised. The company was considering a possible launch in the United States in the past, although this move has never been carried out. Rumours also of a SEAT model being sold as a Volkswagen in Canada and the United States to supplement Volkswagen's brand lineup there have occasionally circulated, but have always been unsubstantiated, and ultimately proven to be false. In the past, other market areas where the brand was also present for a short time were Australia and New Zealand (from 1995 to 1999) and South Africa (from June 2006 to the end of 2008). Still, the brand was withdrawn from those markets due to Volkswagen's decision citing that current and expected circumstances made the ongoing importation of a niche brand unviable. SEAT sold cars in the Russian Federation from 2007 to 2015. SEAT was reintroduced to the New Zealand market in 2017. SEAT re-entered the Australian market in 2022, selling vehicles under their performance marque Cupra. SEAT plans to re-launch in the United States and Canada from mid-2024 to early-2027, selling vehicles under their performance marque Cupra.

== Cupra brand ==
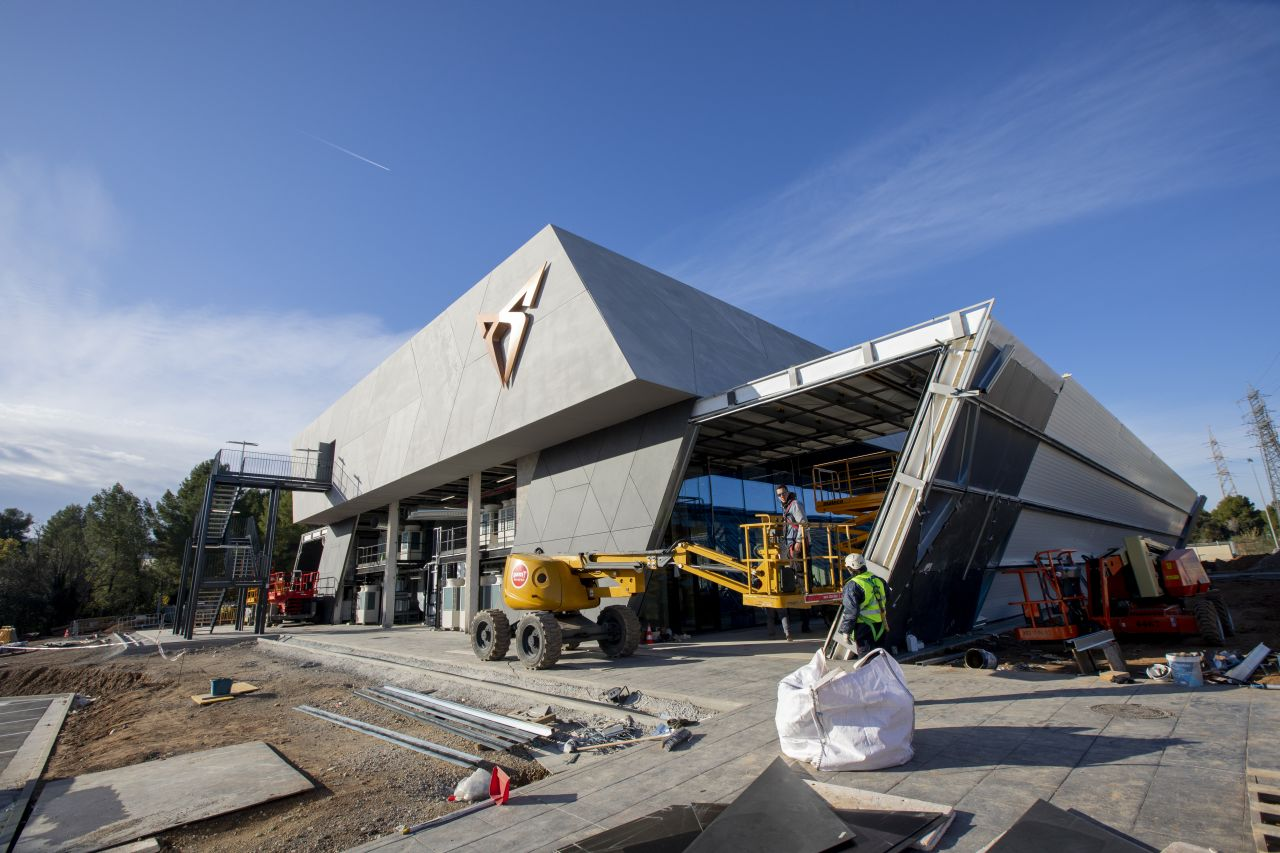
SEAT Cupra headquarters in Martorell, Spain

In 2018, the previous range-topping Cupra trim was launched as a stand-alone brand, alongside SEAT, and at the same time, SEAT Sport became Cupra Racing. Cupra describes itself as 'an unconventional challenger brand, based on stimulating style and contemporary performance that inspires the world from Barcelona with progressive cars and experiences. Cupra has its corporate headquarters in Martorell, Spain, and a network of specialised points of sale around the world.

== Motorsport ==
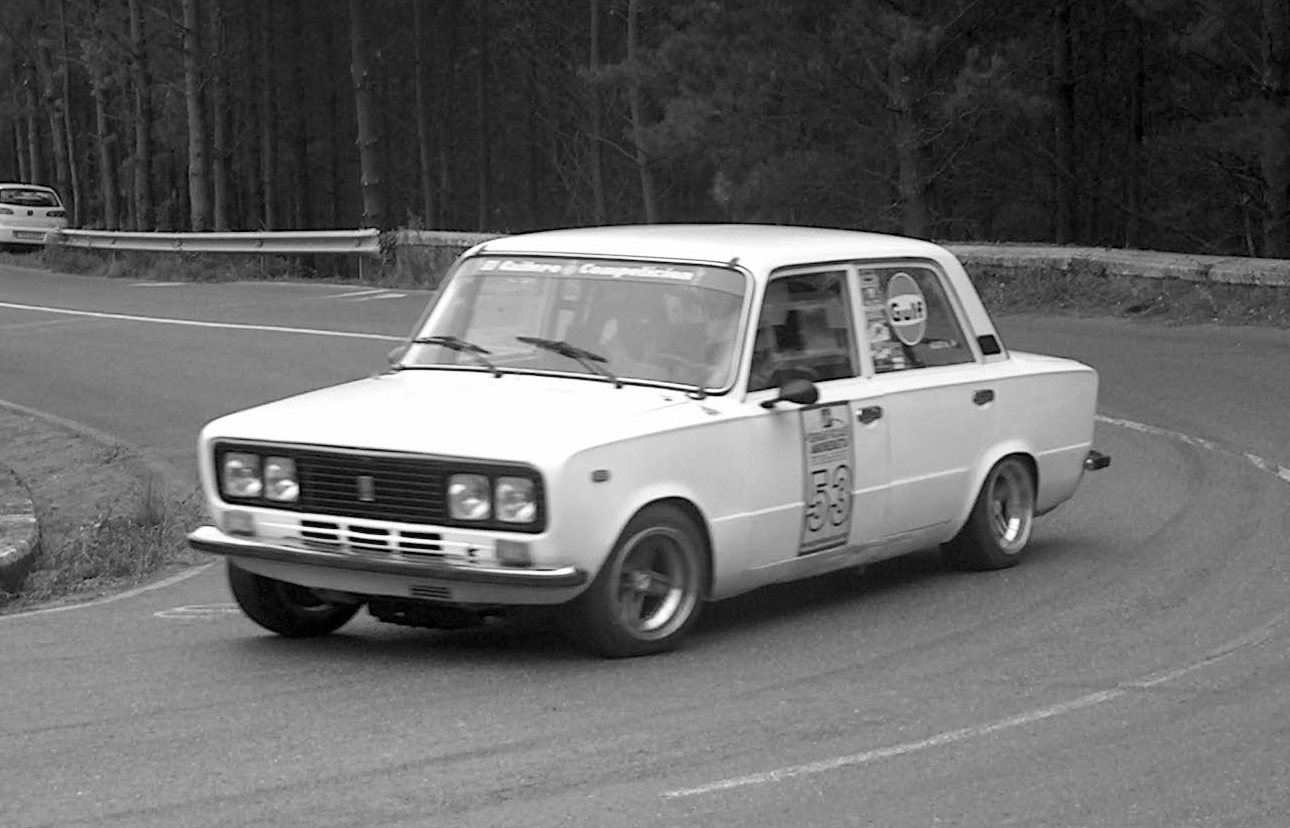
The SEAT 1430 in competition

SEAT's involvement in motorsports began in the 1970s with the brand's contribution to the national formula races in Spain, and by the end of the same decade, the start of its involvement in rallies. In 1971, the Special Vehicles department was formed with the mission to enforce the brand's participation in rally championships, resulting in 11 titles between 1979 and 1983. The year 1985 was when SEAT Sport was founded as a separate motorsport division, and especially since the Volkswagen Group takeover in 1986, SEAT has been increasing, even more, its presence in the motorsport world, mainly down to VW's plan on focusing the SEAT brand as sporty to appeal particularly to the younger generation of drivers. The results of this effort have been SEAT's most prestigious titles in FIA championships, three conquests with the SEAT Ibiza Kit-Car in the FIA 2-Litre World Rally Cup (1996, 1997, 1998), and two times with the SEAT León in the FIA World Touring Car Championship (2008, 2009).

=== Rallying ===
SEAT's first serious attempt at a World Rally Championship (WRC) was in the 1977 season when SEAT took part with its SEAT 1430/124D Especial 1800 race car, and in its debut rallying event at the Montecarlo Rally, the SEAT team finished in the third and fourth places with the official 1430-1800 cars being driven by Antonio Zanini and Salvador Cañellas. In recent years, the consignment was placed on the small SEAT Ibiza, a 1.6-L, normally aspirated, front-wheel drive car with its roots in the Volkswagen Polo. The Ibiza allowed the company to evolve its rallying experience further and was officially engaged in some European national championships. The years went by until a 2-L version of the Ibiza was homologated as a kit car, and extra wide tracks, larger wheels, brakes, etc., were fitted to it as the Fédération Internationale de l'Automobile (FIA) kit-car regulations allow. With these attributes, the car won the 2-Litre World Rally Cup three times (1996, 1997, 1998), proving its maker had accumulated enough experience, and budget, to move to the top category, the World Rally Car class of rallying cars.

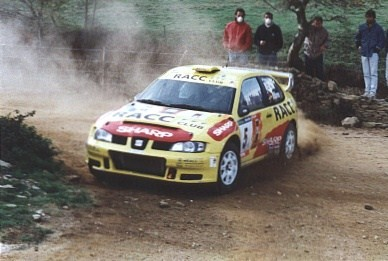
Daniel Solà driving the SEAT Córdoba WRC at the Rallye de Tierra de Cangas del Narcea

SEAT's three conquests of the FIA 2L WRC title, and the sport's popularity in Spain, probably convinced Volkswagen Group management to go further and allow the SEAT Sport department a chance to reach its goal in the top-class WRC category. This situation ended in September 2000, when the company's German upper management revoked its decision forcing SEAT Sport to retire from the World Rally Championship.

SEAT's project to build a WRC-spec car was officially announced during the 1997 San Remo rally. It was in 1998 that the first evolution of the SEAT Córdoba WRC car was presented at the Porto Motor Show and then first enrolled by the company to compete at the highest level of WRC racing. The Córdoba was based on the family saloon of the same name but was, naturally, a WRC class car equipped with an inline-four turbocharged petrol engine, permanent four-wheel drive, and active differentials involved in its transmission. The Córdoba WRC made its debut at the 1998 Rally of Finland, while a further race car development was incarnated on the SEAT Córdoba WRC E2 which was presented at the Barcelona Motor Show in 1999. However, the short wheelbase and high-mounted engine (compared to its rivals) worked against the Córdoba and results were not competitive. Despite hiring ex-WRC champion Didier Auriol, and a new evolution of the car, the SEAT Córdoba WRC E3, SEAT pulled out of international rallying at the end of 2000.

=== Touring cars ===
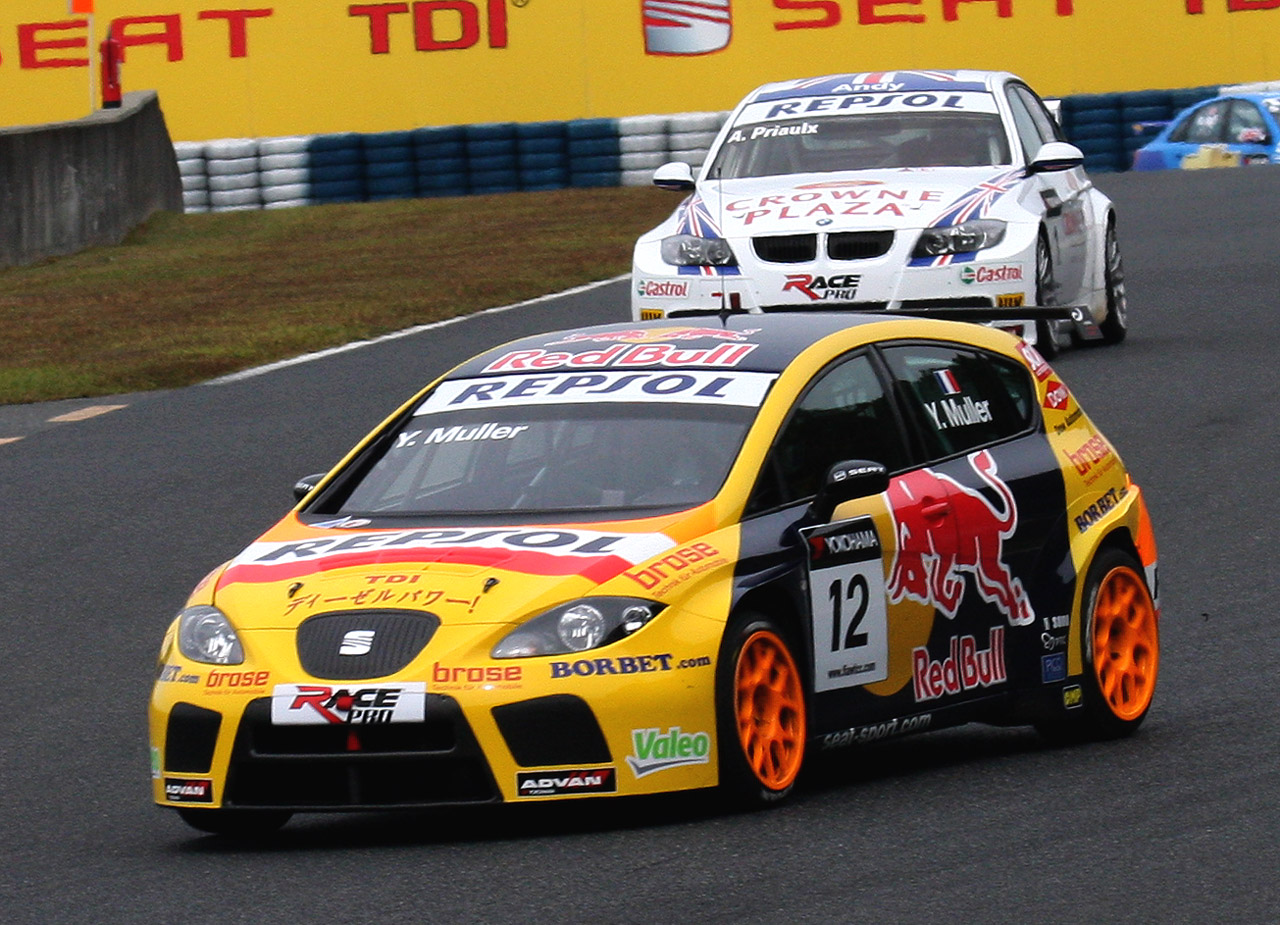
Yvan Muller driving the SEAT León TDI in Japan

In 2002, SEAT announced a one-make championship for the new SEAT León Cupra R, the SEAT León Supercopa.

In 2004, SEAT with Ray Mallock Ltd. (RML) entered the British Touring Car Championship, running two SEAT Toledo Cupra for former-BTCC Champion Jason Plato, and 2003 León UK Champion, Rob Huff. In 2005, Huff left to join Chevrolet (run by RML in the World Touring Car Championship (WTCC)), and he was replaced by 2004 Leon Champion James Pickford, and Luke Hines as SEAT expanded to three cars, now run by Northern South. 2006 saw the Toledo replaced by the new León, and Darren Turner joined the team with James Thompson when his WTCC commitments allowed. 2007 was SEAT's best year in BTCC, as Plato was locked in a season-long battle with Fabrizio Giovanardi, which came down to the final race of the season, but just missed out on the title.

Since 2005, SEAT has also competed in the World Touring Car Championship, with its first best season being 2007 when a failed water pump robbed Yvan Muller of a certain victory at the final meeting in Macau. SEAT became the first team to run a TDI in the WTCC, and this gave them a dominant 2008 World Touring Car Championship season, with Yvan Muller winning the driver's championship. French racing team Oreca cooperates with the WTCC team. SEAT's UK team followed suit in the 2008 BTCC. The BTCC team was sponsored by Holiday Inn.

In 2007, SEAT – with the León Mk2 TDI at the Motorsport Arena Oschersleben in Germany – became the first manufacturer to win a round of the World Touring Car Championship (WTCC) series in a diesel car, only a month after announcing it will enter the FIA World Touring Car Championship with the León TDI. SEAT's success with the León TDI continued and resulted in winning consecutively the 2008 World Touring Car Championship and 2009 World Touring Car Championship both titles (for drivers as well as for manufacturers').

In September 2008, SEAT UK announced that it would withdraw from all motor sport activity in the UK at the end of the season. The SEAT Cupra Championship and the SEAT BTCC campaign ended at Brands Hatch on 21 September. BTCC drivers Jason Plato and Darren Turner have been left without drives for 2009. But Plato will drive for Silverline Chevrolet.

At the opening of the 2009 WTCC, SEAT placed 1st, 2nd, 3rd, and 4th in both races in Brazil. At the second meeting of the WTCC (in Mexico), the SEAT team placed 1st, 4th, 6th, 7th and 11th in the first race. In the second race, they placed 1st, 3rd, 7th, and 8th. While SEAT may have withdrawn from the BTCC, they are showing impressive results in the WTCC.

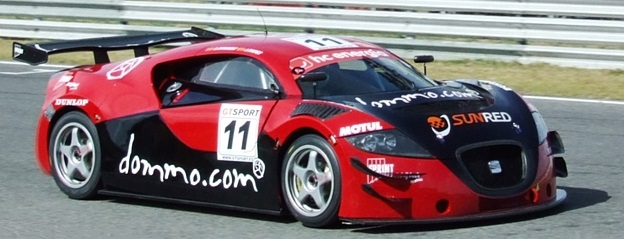
The SEAT Cupra GT in the Spanish GT championship for the SunRED racing team

=== Grand tourer cars ===
In 2003, the SEAT Sport division presented at the Barcelona Motor Show first as a concept car and later the final version of the SEAT Cupra GT race car, which was produced in limited series on customer demand addressed to expertised individuals and racing teams willing to take part in race events.

The Cupra GT was chosen as a GT race car from racing teams, like the Sunred Engineering (SunRED) team, making its debut in 2004 in the Spanish GT Championship, and took part in several Grand tourer circuits not only in Spain but also run in tracks abroad like those of Monza and Magny-Cours.

=== Formula ===
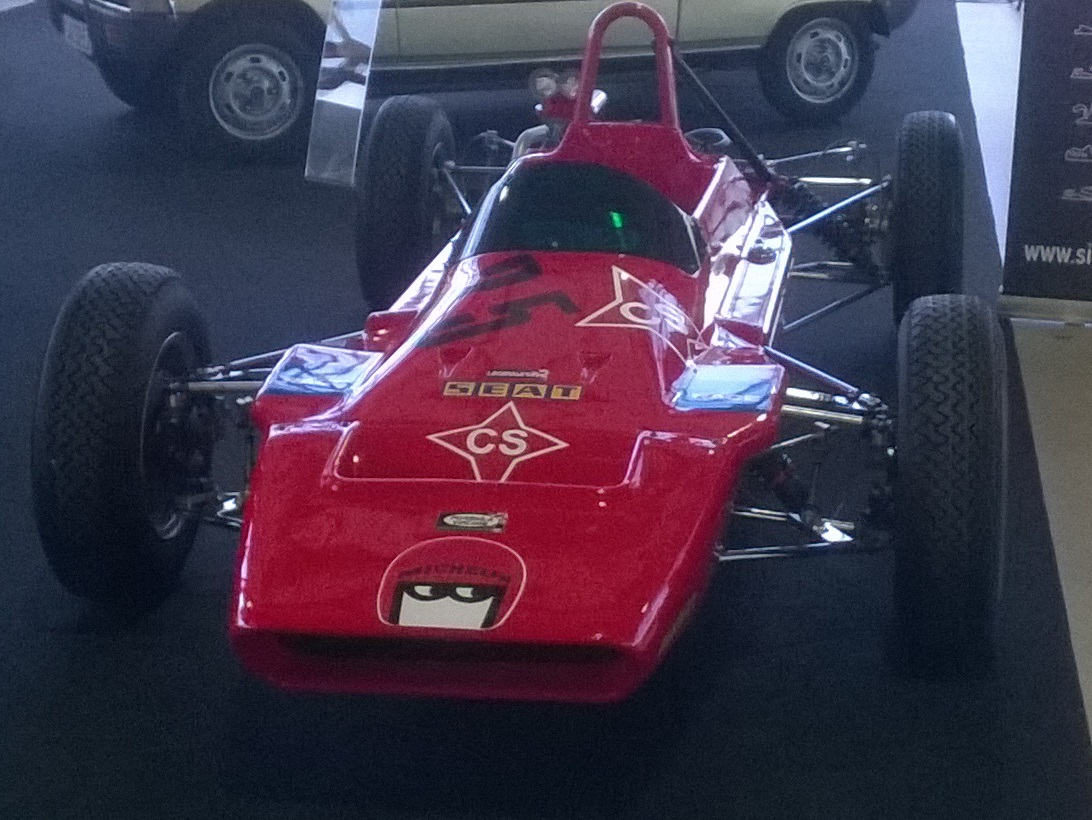
SEAT Formula 1430

In 2002, SEAT announced a one-make championship for the new SEAT León Cupra R, the SEAT León Supercopa. In 1970 SEAT set up the 'Fórmula Nacional' series in Spain, a year later to be known as Formula 1430. The single-seater formula cars, which took part driven by young Spanish drivers, were equipped under support from SEAT with engines of the 1430 model and 6700 gearboxes. The first race of the 'Fórmula Nacional' series took place at the Jarama circuit in Madrid.

== Model range ==
=== SEAT models ===
Ibiza	León	Arona
Supermini	Small family car	B-segment Crossover
Hatchback	Hatchback; Sportstourer (estate/wagon)	Crossover

=== Cupra models ===
León	Formentor	Born	Tavascan	Terramar	Raval
Small family car	CUV Coupé	Small family car	C-segment Crossover	C-segment Crossover	Supermini
Hatchback; Sportstourer (estate/wagon)	CUV	Hatchback; Electric Car	Crossover; Electric Car	Crossover	Hatchback; Electric Car

== Nomenclature ==
SEAT's corporate tradition, as a Volkswagen Group subsidiary, dictates that the nomenclature of its model range be inspired by Spanish culture. Thus, a large number of SEAT's production models have been named after places in Spain (e.g. Arosa, Ibiza, Córdoba, León, Toledo, Altea, Alhambra, Málaga, Marbella, Ronda etc.). However, there have been several exceptions: for example, the name for the SEAT Exeo – added to the brand's range in 2008 – was influenced by the Latin word exire which means "to go beyond".

Following the marque's naming trend with production models, many of SEAT's concept cars adopted names inspired by either Hispanic dances (e.g. tango, bolero, salsa), abbreviations related to existing production models (e.g. IBZ for Ibiza, IBE for Ibiza Eléctrico, TL for Toledo etc.), or names reminiscent of SEAT's historic sporting roots (e.g. Fórmula, Cupra GT).

Moreover, in recent years, special versions of the production models' specific ranges have been added, such as the SC (for SportCoupé edition,) or ST (for SportTourer) differentiating the three-door and the estate versions from the standard four- and five-door ones, while the Cupra (for Cup Racing edition) and FR (for Fórmula Racing) has been used for the high-performance models in the range, signalising SEAT's positioning as a sport-oriented brand involved in racing.

Historic references can be found with the iconic Bocanegra name, meaning "black mouth" in Spanish, which accompanies the Ibiza model and has its origins in the SEAT 1200 Sport, which was the original SEAT Bocanegra due to its black-painted fascia in the front.

== Sub-ranges ==
'Ecomotive' range

Almost every model in SEAT's range has an 'Ecomotive' derivative version, which in comparison to the standard version has a more eco-friendly tuning. Reduction of weight, low-resistance tyres, new aerodynamics, tweaks in the suspension, as well as changes made to the engine's electronic management software with an additional implementation of a maintenance-free Diesel Particle Filter (DPF) for the diesel engines, also updates in the gearbox and the gear ratios with a gearshift indicator in the dash panel reminding when it is the proper time to change gears, combined with an engine 'Start/Stop system' and an 'Energy Recuperation system' are some of the modifications adopted in the Ecomotive range in order to cut down both fuel consumption and emissions. The result is a range with some of the cleanest models featuring an improvement not only in gas and particles emissions but also in fuel economy, without big compromise in the vehicle's dynamic performance or practicality; for example the SEAT Ibiza Ecomotive 1.4 TDI has CO_{2} emissions coming up at 98 g/km and still it comes even faster from 0 to 100 km/h than the standard version featuring a 5-door body and air-conditioning, while the SEAT León Ecomotive's CO_{2} emissions are among the lowest in its segment too and raise up to 99 g/km. Up to the present, the Ecomotive range has been renowned on many occasions. In 2008, the Ibiza Ecomotive has been declared on top of the Verkehrs-Club Deutschland's 2008/2009 list in the "environmentally beneficial vehicle" category and in the 10th Eco Tour not only it has won in the small diesel class but also proved to be the overall winner of all categories. In that specific year the SEAT Ibiza Ecomotive was also awarded the 'Ecobest 2008' award by the Autobest organisation and the German newspaper Bild am Sonntag named it the 'most economic car of its class in the world. The year 2009 has been the one when once more the Ibiza Ecomotive was nominated for the 'Green Steering wheel' award in Switzerland, and set two consecutive times a new world record on fuel saving with a single tank, certified by the IPMC (International Police Motor Corporation) : the first when the Austrian Gerhard Plattner drove from Martorell (Spain) to Göttingen (Germany) with an average fuel consumption of 2.9 L/100 km and the second time in his route from Cieszyn (Poland) to Frankfurt (Germany) having achieved the world record in fuel consumption of 2.34 L/100 km (or 100 mpg U.S.) covering a distance of 1,910 km on a single tank.

'MultiFuel' range

The MultiFuel range consists of the introduction of the flexible-fuel vehicle bio-ethanol technology in selected SEAT models – i.e., the SEAT León MultiFuel, the SEAT Altea MultiFuel and the SEAT Altea XL MultiFuel – with the implementation of the 1.6 MPI MultiFuel E85 motor, capable of producing exactly the same horsepower (102 bhp) just like the relevant pure petrol version of the engine.

== Sales ==
Since its beginnings in 1953, more than 16 million SEAT cars have been produced, with the most successful product in the range being the SEAT Ibiza. This model has sold over 4 million units in its four generations up to the present.

In the year 2009, the total annual retail sales number of SEAT cars was 336,683 vehicles, while the annual production of vehicles under the SEAT brand came up to 307,502 units (301,287 made in SEAT's Martorell plant and 6,215 in other Volkswagen group's factories).

The total production per year of SEAT and Cupra cars manufactured in SEAT/Cupra and other Volkswagen group plants is shown below. not comprising cars of other Volkswagen group brands, produced in SEAT-owned facilities:

Model	1986	1987	1988	1989	1990	1991	1992	1993	1994	1995	1996	1997	1998	1999	2000	2001	2002	2003	2004	2005	2006	2007	2008	2009	2010	2011	2012	2013	2014	2015	2016	2017	2018	2019	2020	2021	2022	2023	2024
SEAT Marbella (Note: Including the SEAT Panda.)	36,879	56,893	71,519	82,935	90,903	80,005	74,637	33,216	27,102	29,621	21,930	18,139	2,337	—	—	—	—	—	—	—	—	—	—	—	—	—	—	—	—	—	—	—	—	—	—	—	—	—	—
SEAT Arosa	—	—	—	—	—	—	—	—	—	—	—	42,741	38,338	46,410	28,403	22,980	19,627	13,814	9,368	—	—	—	—	—	—	—	—	—	—	—	—	—	—	—	—	—	—	—	—
SEAT Mii	—	—	—	—	—	—	—	—	—	—	—	—	—	—	—	—	—	—	—	—	—	—	—	—	—	990	26,409	25,489	25,845	24,516	18,720	13,825	14,369	11,479	7,593	8,648	—	—	—
SEAT Ibiza (Note: Including the SEAT Ibiza SC and the SEAT Ibiza ST.)	121,526	160,907	192,024	208,210	202,157	173,236	112,334	142,987	140,974	158,284	153,000	168,492	180,775	194,245	199,279	188,427	197,311	220,497	183,754	168,645	183,848	172,206	192,470	173,715	189,083	191,183	160,887	145,041	153,633	160,451	149,988	160,377	120,287	130,243	74,564	83,710	60,385	74,355	108,058
Cupra Raval	—	—	—	—	—	—	—	—	—	—	—	—	—	—	—	—	—	—	—	—	—	—	—	—	—	—	—	—	—	—	—	—	—	—	—	—	—	—	2
SEAT Arona	—	—	—	—	—	—	—	—	—	—	—	—	—	—	—	—	—	—	—	—	—	—	—	—	—	—	—	—	—	—	—	17,527	110,926	134,611	78,823	98,656	85,717	76,594	88,478
SEAT Terra (Note: Including the SEAT Trans.)	18,444	18,238	24,925	22,007	35,430	22,198	25,034	10,626	6,517	—	—	—	—	—	—	—	—	—	—	—	—	—	—	—	—	—	—	—	—	—	—	—	—	—	—	—	—	—	—
SEAT Inca	—	—	—	—	—	—	—	—	—	3,921	16,836	14,414	17,226	19,221	16,328	15,207	11,802	7,982	—	—	—	—	—	—	—	—	—	—	—	—	—	—	—	—	—	—	—	—	—
SEAT Inca Kombi	—	—	—	—	—	—	—	—	—	104	9,328	11,070	7,708	8,573	5,534	5,316	3,879	2,150	—	—	—	—	—	—	—	—	—	—	—	—	—	—	—	—	—	—	—	—	—
SEAT Córdoba (Note: Including the SEAT Córdoba Vario.)	—	—	—	—	—	—	—	19,289	84,128	79,793	77,436	96,946	108,749	111,894	97,685	78,770	58,646	59,348	46,821	37,568	31,058	29,747	20,439	4,861	—	—	—	—	—	—	—	—	—	—	—	—	—	—	—
SEAT León (Note: Including the SEAT León SC, SEAT León ST and Cupra León.)	—	—	—	—	—	—	—	—	—	—	—	—	—	6,080	93,123	91,939	93,606	96,536	90,850	98,130	126,511	120,630	96,761	66,368	79,462	80,736	71,295	114,568	157,087	169,455	163,228	163,306	159,486	153,837	124,323	83,813	56,317	102,965	105,864
Cupra Born	—	—	—	—	—	—	—	—	—	—	—	—	—	—	—	—	—	—	—	—	—	—	—	—	—	—	—	—	—	—	—	—	—	—	—	4,801	36,153	45,748	42,922
SEAT Altea (Note: Including the SEAT Altea XL and the SEAT Altea Freetrack.)	—	—	—	—	—	—	—	—	—	—	—	—	—	—	—	—	—	—	67,125	65,174	58,288	71,377	54,770	32,791	43,351	42,329	27,478	21,284	19,142	13,001	—	—	—	—	—	—	—	—	—
SEAT Málaga	41,292	37,653	39,269	36,882	33,098	8,735	—	—	—	—	—	—	—	—	—	—	—	—	—	—	—	—	—	—	—	—	—	—	—	—	—	—	—	—	—	—	—	—	—
SEAT Toledo	—	—	—	—	41	76,336	144,205	90,533	47,965	55,493	53,404	42,596	42,325	105,818	59,480	47,645	39,503	36,026	38,962	20,600	8,613	4,744	5,484	571	—	—	5,000	21,771	16,541	19,728	18,029	13,146	10,151	1,506	—	—	—	—	—
SEAT Exeo (Note: Including the SEAT Exeo ST.)	—	—	—	—	—	—	—	—	—	—	—	—	—	—	—	—	—	—	—	—	—	—	369	22,981	23,108	19,559	10,854	4,681	—	—	—	—	—	—	—	—	—	—	—
SEAT Alhambra	—	—	—	—	—	—	—	—	—	—	10,513	16,503	21,300	27,440	23,924	26,524	26,308	23,693	21,580	14,902	14,352	14,242	10,282	6,215	10,023	18,139	19,393	19,990	22,612	27,925	31,214	33,638	19,588	23,015	14,672	4,169	5,341	—	—
SEAT Ateca (Note: Including the Cupra Ateca.)	—	—	—	—	—	—	—	—	—	—	—	—	—	—	—	—	—	—	—	—	—	—	—	—	—	—	—	—	—	—	35,833	77,483	90,824	98,397	76,710	58,500	58,157	83,714	74,592
SEAT Tarraco	—	—	—	—	—	—	—	—	—	—	—	—	—	—	—	—	—	—	—	—	—	—	—	—	—	—	—	—	—	—	—	—	2,398	38,721	18,726	22,437	12,453	25,562	8,856
Cupra Formentor	—	—	—	—	—	—	—	—	—	—	—	—	—	—	—	—	—	—	—	—	—	—	—	—	—	—	—	—	—	—	—	—	—	—	11,041	58,863	105,568	124,670	110,611
Cupra Terramar	—	—	—	—	—	—	—	—	—	—	—	—	—	—	—	—	—	—	—	—	—	—	—	—	—	—	—	—	—	—	—	—	—	—	—	—	—	—	16,663
Cupra Tavascan	—	—	—	—	—	—	—	—	—	—	—	—	—	—	—	—	—	—	—	—	—	—	—	—	—	—	—	—	—	—	—	—	—	—	—	—	—	—	27,172
Total	218,141	273,691	327,737	350,034	361,629	360,510	356,210	296,651	306,686	327,216	342,447	410,901	418,758	519,681	523,756	476,808	450,682	460,046	458,460	405,019	422,670	412,946	380,575	307,502	345,027	352,936	321,316	352,824	394,860	415,076	417,012	479,302	528,029	591,809	406,452	423,597	420,091	533,608	583,218

== Rebadges ==
Under Volkswagen Group's ownership, numerous SEAT models have been rebadged under other brands, either inside the Volkswagen Group's portfolio or out of it.

In particular, some examples concerning the rebadges deriving from SEAT models and being carried out under other Volkswagen Group's brands, are the SEAT Ibiza Mk2 which has been rebadged under the VW brand as the VW Polo Playa, the SEAT Córdoba Mk1 rebadged as the VW Polo Classic – FAW-VW City-Golf – VW Derby, the SEAT Arosa as the VW Lupo, and the SEAT Inca as the VW Caddy.

Further rebadges have come under non-Volkswagen Group brand ranges. Some notable examples are the SEAT Ibiza Mk1, which has been rebadged as the Nanjing Yuejin Eagle NJ6400-Unique NJ6400-Soyat NJ7150-Soyat Unique NJ1020, and the SEAT Toledo Mk1 as the Chery A11-Fulwin-Fengyun-Windcloud – Chery A15-A168-Amulet-Cowin-Qiyun-Flagcloud – Vortex Corda.

On the other hand, several SEAT models have derived as rebadges coming from other Volkswagen Group's brands such as the SEAT Alhambra Mk1 and Mk2 respectively from the VW Sharan Mk1 and Mk2 (the first generation resulting after a joint venture of the Volkswagen Group together with Ford), the SEAT Exeo from the Audi A4 B7, the Seat Mii from the VW Up, and the Seat Toledo Mk4 from the Skoda Rapid.

== Tuning companies ==
Several tuning companies have produced modified or high-performance versions of various SEAT models, some significant examples among those being Abt Sportsline, Je Design, APR, MTM, Abarth, Emelba, Podadera Design, etc.

== Company profile ==
=== Logo history ===
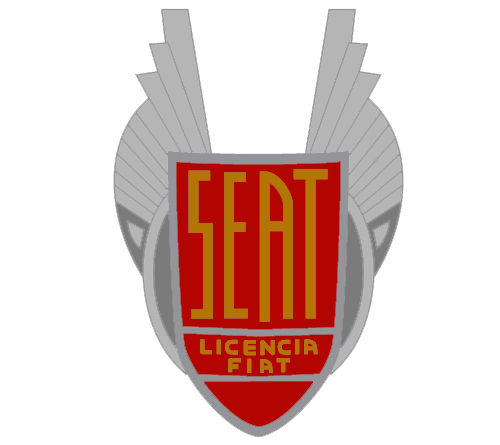
1953–68 (Note: Has resemblance with the Fiat logo of that time due to the partnership between both companies, which ended in 1982.)

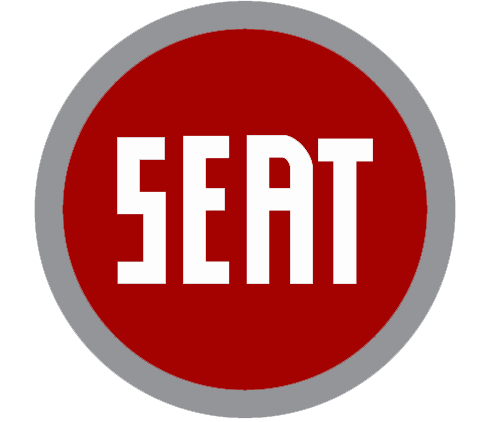
1968–70

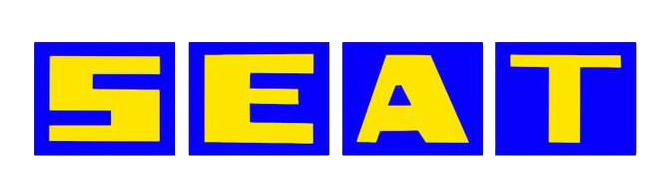
1970–82

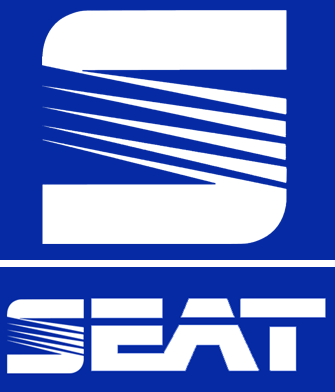
1982–90

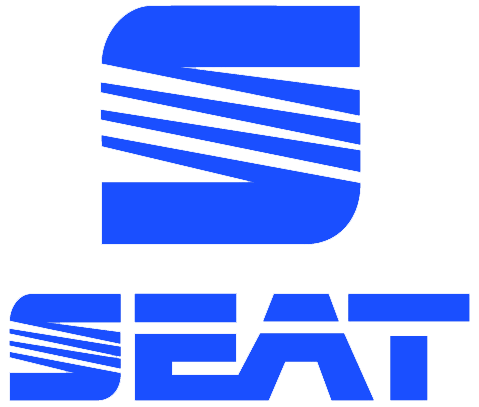
1990–99

1998–2012

2012–17

2017–present (Note: Used for the "SEAT" brand of vehicles)

2020–present (corporate) (Note: Used for the global SEAT S.A., unifying the SEAT and Cupra brands.)

=== Leadership ===
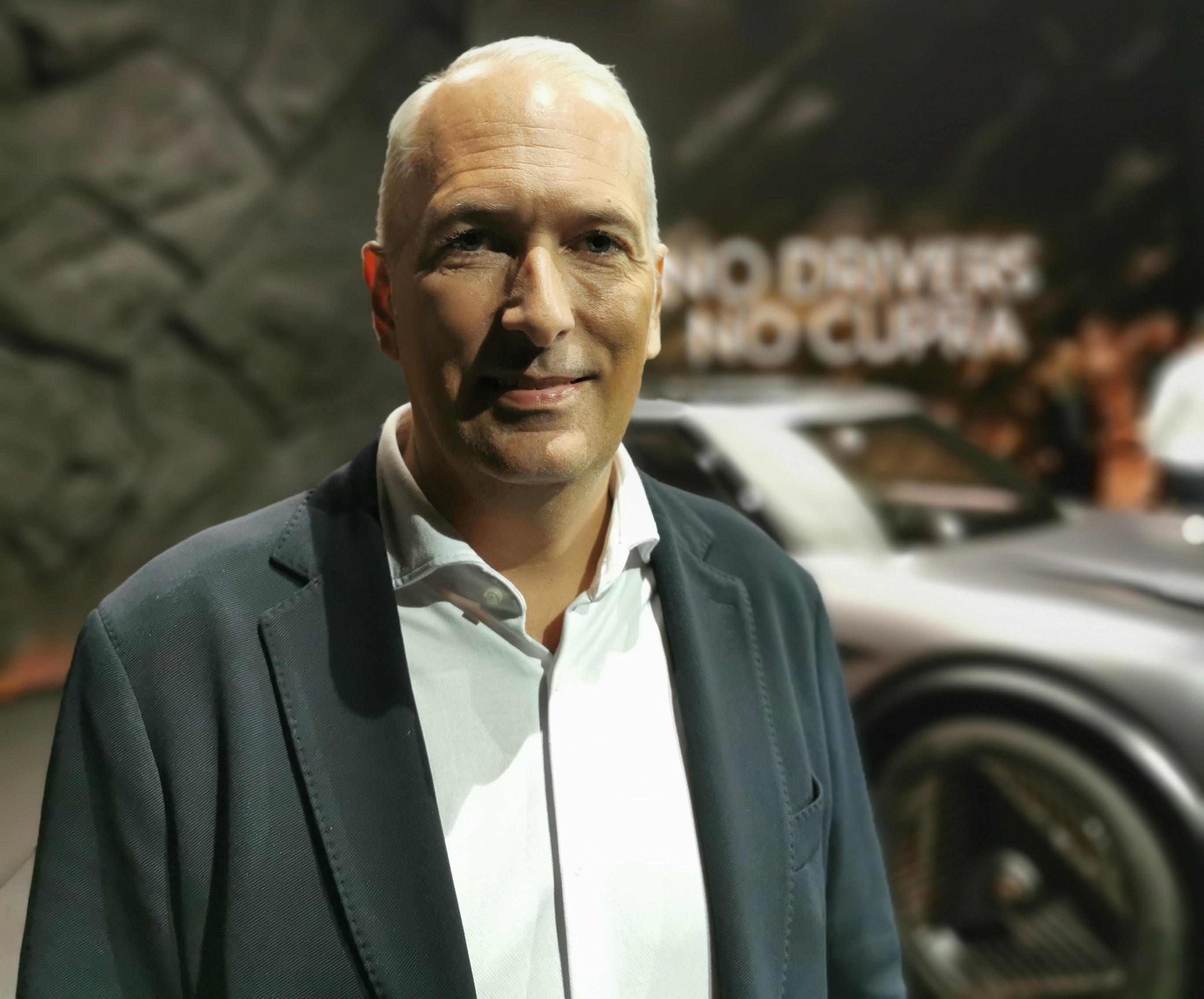
Markus Haupt (2025)

Today as a Volkswagen Group subsidiary, SEAT's leading people are appointed after approval from the group's supervisory board.

Leaders
From	To	Person(s)
1950	May 1967	José Ortiz-Echagüe Puertas
May 1967	February 1977	Juan Sánchez Cortés
February 1977	December 1983	Juan Miguel Antoñanzas Pérez-Egea
January 1984	September 1993	Juan Antonio Díaz Álvarez
October 1993	October 1993	Peter Walzer
November 1993	December 1996	Juan Llorens Carrió
January 1997	June 1999	Pierre-Alain de Smedt
18 June 1999	30 June 2000	Bruno Adelt
1 July 2000	6 March 2002	Bernd Pischetsrieder
7 March 2002	30 September 2006	Andreas Schleef
1 October 2006	31 August 2009	Erich Schmitt
1 September 2009	30 April 2013	James Muir
1 May 2013	30 September 2015	Juergen Stackmann
1 November 2015	6 January 2020	Luca de Meo
7 January 2020	30 September 2020	Carsten Isensee
1 October 2020	31 March 2025	Wayne Griffiths
1 April 2025	present	Markus Haupt

=== Economic figures ===
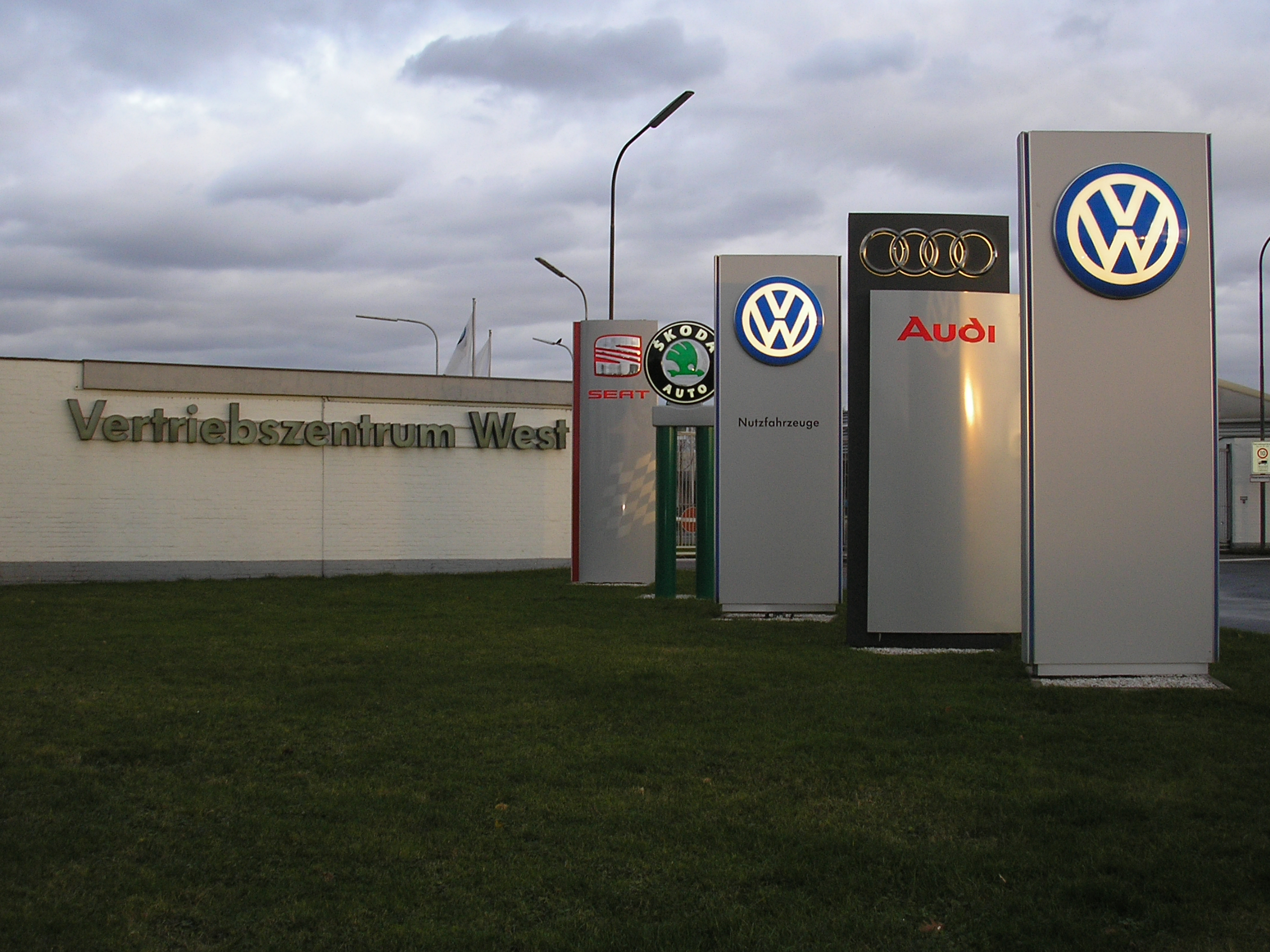
Volkswagen group's distribution centre in Germany

Financial results
Year	After-tax result (in millions of euros)
1996	+ 32,088
1997	+ 66,418
1998	+ 147,020
1999	+ 85,403
2000	+ 87,348
2001	+ 233,121
2002	+ 202,965
2003	+ 134,494
2004	+ 144,957
2005	62, 513
2006	49,088
2007	+ 169,703
2008	+ 44,400
2009	186,500
2010	103,900
2011	61,500
2012	29,600
2013	148,700
2014	65,700
2015	+ 6,000
2016	+ 903,200
2017	+ 281,200
2018	+ 294,200
2019	+ 345,600
2020	+ 194,200

=== Slogans ===
SEAT currently does not use a slogan. Here are most of the slogans used by SEAT before:

- SEAT, Grupo Volkswagen (19??–????; not quite a slogan but rather signifying Volkswagen Group ownership)
- SEAT, auto emoción (2000–2011)
- SEAT, Enjoyneering (2011–2014)
- SEAT, Technology to Enjoy (2014–2017)

=== Environmental policy ===
Electric and hybrid technology development

Since the early 1990s, SEAT has developed and presented several prototypes with either full electric or hybrid powertrain, including the SEAT Toledo Mk1 electric model (1992), the SEAT Ibiza Mk2 electric car (1993), the SEAT Inca electric van (1995), the SEAT León Mk2 Twin drive (2009), the SEAT IBE concept (2010) and the SEAT IBX concept SUV (2011) hybrid cars.

'SEAT al Sol' project

The 'SEAT al Sol' project consists in the integration of use of solar power through a system of photovoltaic panels generating electricity in SEAT's factory in Martorell. The project will be carried through in collaboration with GA-Solar from the beginning of 2010, covering a factory area of 320,000 m^{2} with a system of more than 10 MW of photovoltaic panels. This installation is expected to produce more than 13 million kWh of electricity annually, aimed at reducing greenhouse gas emissions by over 6,200 tonnes of CO_{2} per year.

'Cenit verde' project

The Cenit VERDE initiative is a research project backed by the CENIT (the National Strategic Consortia for Technical Research) programme and supported by the Spanish Ministry of Science and Innovation, in which SEAT plays a key role. Aiming at developing technologies, components and infrastructure for hybrid and electrically powered cars in Spain, this programme brings together 16 technology companies (including Siemens, Endesa, Iberdrola, REE, Cegasa, Ficosa, Circuitor, Cobra or Lear) and 16 universities and research establishments under the CTM coordination (Centre Tecnològic in Manresa) and the support of the CDTI (Centre for Industrial Technological Development, an organization pertaining to the Ministry of Science and Innovation).

In January 2010, the Cenit Verde association made its opening meeting at SEAT's Technical Centre in Martorell.

As part of its contribution SEAT comes in with its own 'Verde' pre-project, including the technology implemented in the plug-in hybrid SEAT León Twin drive as well as in the SEAT IBE concept zero-emissions electric vehicle presented in the 2010 Geneva motor show.

SEAT Autometro project

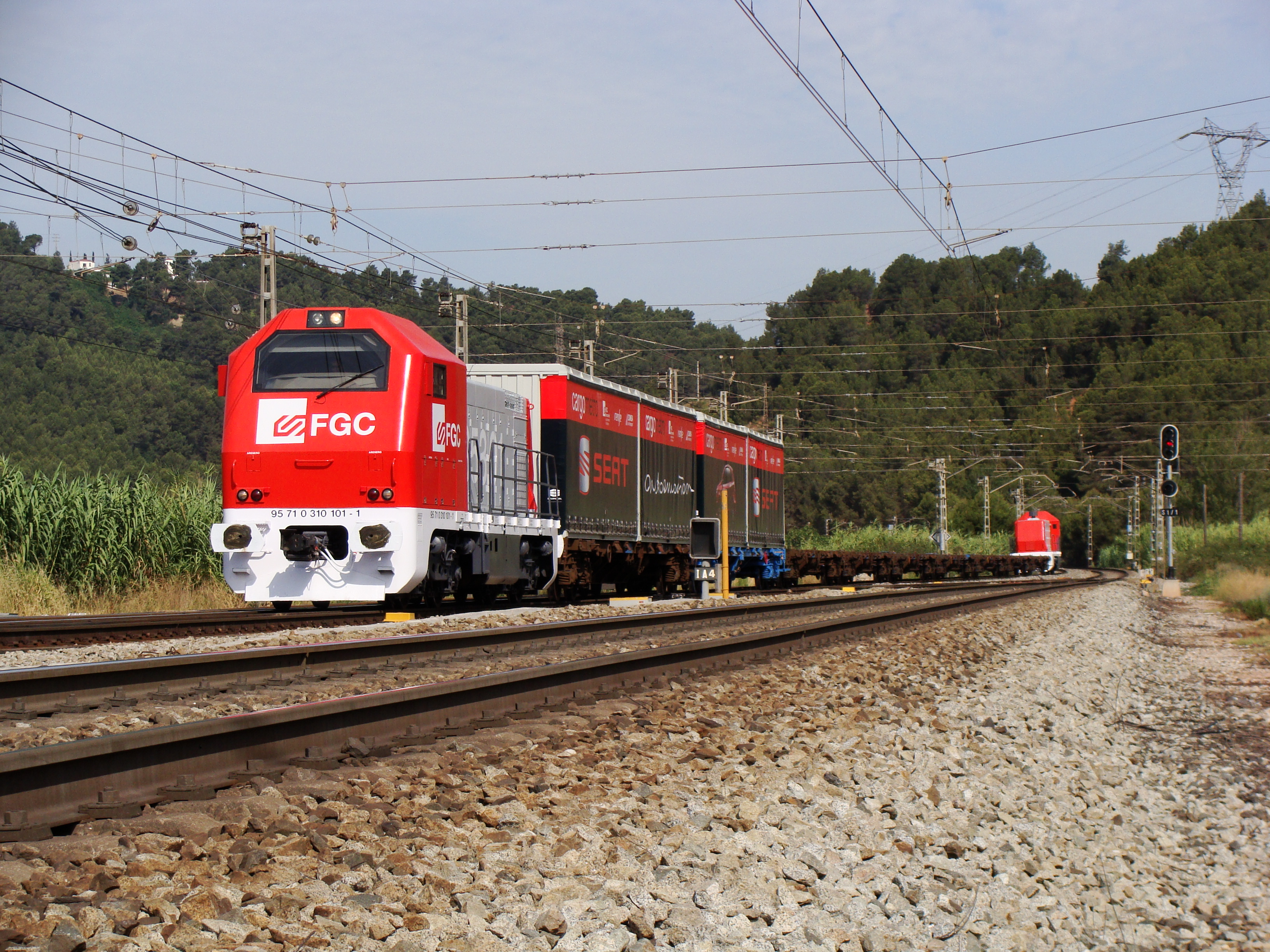
A TMD (Teco Media Distancia) cargo train on its way from SEAT's Martorell plant

The 'SEAT Autometro' project comprises the construction and management of a rail link service between SEAT's Martorell complex and the Port of Barcelona, in the aim of transport of vehicles and components. Autometro is the joint-venture company which operates the rail, having Ferrocarrils de la Generalitat de Catalunya (FGC) local rail company, COMSA Rail Transport and Pecovasa as its shareholders. The company was founded in November 2005, almost five months after an initial agreement was signed between the Catalan government (Generalitat), the Barcelona Port Authority and SEAT. Due to this project, a branch connecting the Martorell plant with the FGC 'Llobregat-Anoia' main rail line had to be constructed, as well as further adaptations to the transport network and the host infrastructures in the Port of Barcelona, had to be made. The budget for the project comes up to 6.8 million euros, while SEAT, on its part, also assumes the operational transport costs.
The use of this rail link since January 18, 2008, instead of road transport, has helped not only in terms of cost-effectiveness and road safety but also in the reduction of both road congestion and greenhouse gas emissions.
Over the whole 'Autometro' project awards have been given for the best logistics idea at the 2007 International Logistics Fair (SIL) and specifically to SEAT as the 2008 Distinguished loader by the Loaders' Association of the Port of Barcelona.

=== Sponsorship ===
SEAT has been a sponsor in major sports, music and cultural events, such as:

- FIFA World Cup (1982)
- SEAT Orbea cycling team (1986)
- 1992 Summer Olympics and the 1992 Summer Paralympics
- Paris Saint-Germain (1994–1995 season)
- "Guapa Tour SEAT· from Spanish band La Oreja de Van Gogh (2006)
- European leg of the "Oral Fixation Tour" by Shakira (2007)
- UEFA Europa League (2009–2012)
- Copa del Rey (from 2010)
- Rock in Rio Madrid (2010)
- Black Eyed Peas in Barcelona (2010)
- Red Bull Air Race World Championship
- Valencia Open (2010)
- Davis Cup World Group Final
- European leg of the "Sale El Sol" tour by Shakira (2010–2011)
- Shamrock Rovers FCB, Irish football club (2012)
- Sponsoring of the following football teams (2012–present): Sevilla FC, Real Betis, Athletic Club, Valencia CF, Real Zaragoza, Villarreal and Eintracht Braunschweig.
- Primavera Sound (2017)
- Lolapalooza Paris & Berlin (2018)
- IV International Compliance Congress (2019)
- Sónar (2019)
- SM Copa de la Reina Football Cup (2019)
- Sponsor and official car of the Women's Spanish Football Team
- Official Sponsor of the 23rd edition of the International fashion platform 080 Barcelona (2019)

The company was one of the prime sponsors of Tunisia's national basketball team at the 2015 FIBA Africa Championship where the company's logo was regularly displayed (e.g. on the team's shorts).

Further, SEAT is a strong supporter of artists, like Shakira, Armin van Buuren, David Guetta and fictional characters such as Lara Croft.

== Awards ==
Over the years the SEAT marque has been honoured with several awards, such as

- The Landaben plant, 100% owned by SEAT, S.A. by that time, received in 1986 the World quality award (Q-86)
- The Martorell plant, 100% owned by SEAT, S.A., received in 1998 the 'Best factory of the VW Group in the first quarter' award
- The Barcelona 'Gearbox del Prat' plant, 100% owned by SEAT, S.A., received in 2009 the Volkswagen Excellence award for its high-quality manufacturing process and product
- The SEAT brand itself in 2009 has been named 'Most Improved Used Car Brand of the decade' in the CAP Used Car of the Decade Awards
- 'AvD Innovationspreis 2006' award for technological innovations developed at the SEAT Technical Centre in Martorell, from the German automobile club 'Automobilclub von Deutschland' (AvD)
- In the 2007 Barcelona International motor show SEAT received two awards for the best technological innovations in the automotive sector, for the LED modules implementation in headlights and the project of virtual fabrication and applied ergonomics
- 'Best project in the use of an electronic signature in the private sector in 2008' for SEAT's electronic invoicing system, by the Catalan Certification Agency (CATCert)
- 'Best logistics initiative 2007' award for the SEAT-Autometro project, by the International Logistics Salon
- 'Port of Barcelona's Distinguished Loader prize in 2008' , by the Port of Barcelona's Loaders' Association

== See also ==
- Sehol
- Formula 1430
