= Carsten Isensee =

German business executive (born 1960)

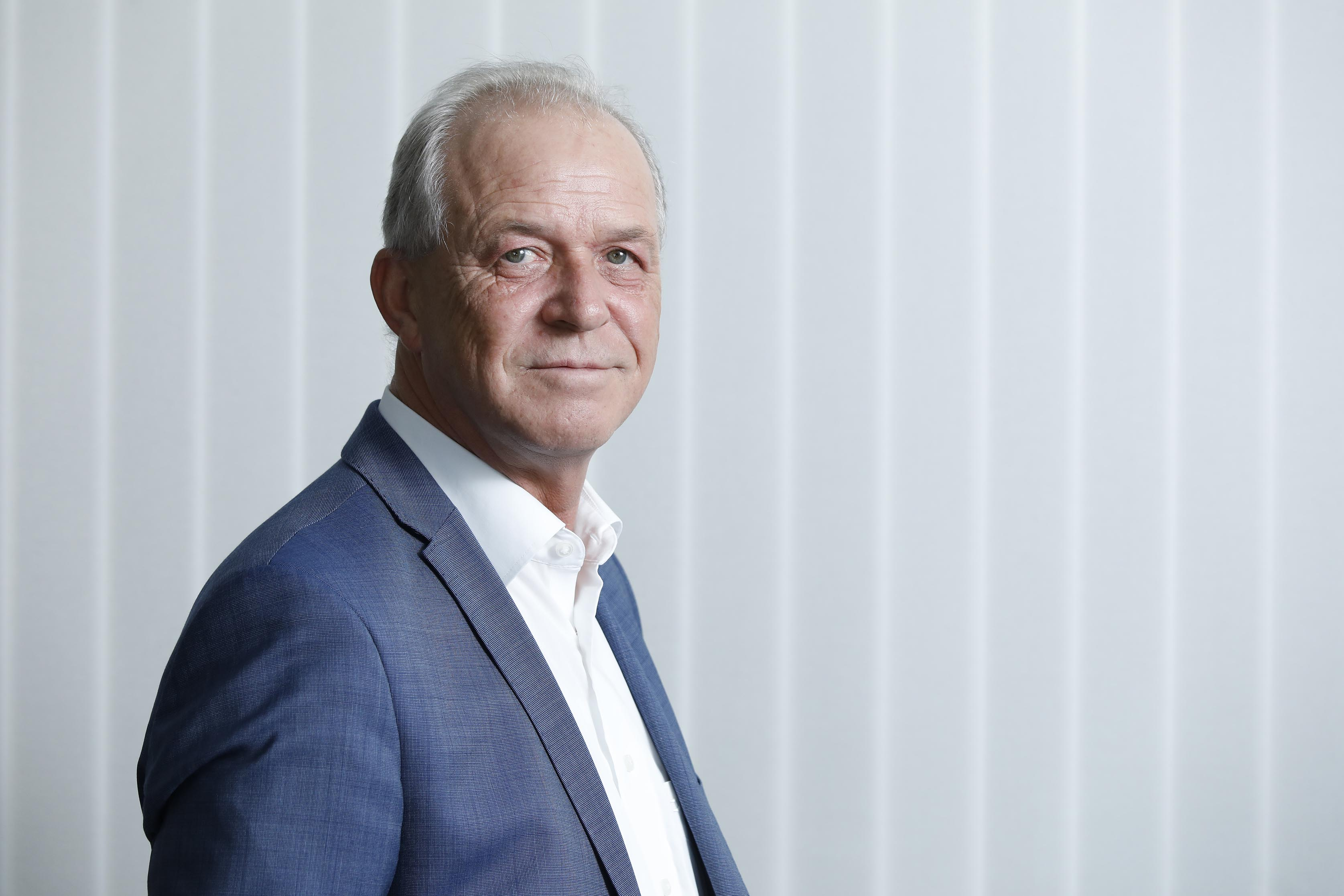
- Born: 1960 (age 65–66); Ahnsen, West Germany
- Education: Wilhelmshaven University
- Occupations: Vice President of Finance and IT
- Years active: 1987-...
- Employer: SEAT

Carsten Isensee (born 1960) is a German business executive. He is currently the Executive Vice President of Finance and IT, having previously held executive roles in the Volkswagen Group. He was acting President of SEAT from January to October 2020.

== Early life ==
Carsten Isensee graduated from the University of Wilhelmshaven with a degree in business management, and began his career with Volkswagen Group in 1987.

== Career ==
He has spent his entire career with the Volkswagen Group, that he joined in 1987. He has held various positions in the Volkswagen finance department at the Group's headquarters in Germany and other locations. During this period, he was a member of the Finance and Control Board in Slovakia, served as Director of Finance and IT in South Africa and later as Director of Finance, Information Technology and Corporate Strategy in Brazil.

Throughout his career, among other positions, he has represented the company in the stock market and in negotiations with shareholders, political institutions, trade unions and government organizations. He has launched organizational restructuring programs and, in China, he participated in the creation of digital and intelligent mobility services. As Executive Vice President of Finance, Isensee is responsible for strengthening the company's record profit and investment figures and is reinforcing the financial base for SEAT's future projects.

In 2014 Isensee became the Vice President of Finance for Volkswagen Group China. In 2019 he was named the executive vice-president for finance and IT for SEAT. He was acting president of SEAT from January to October 2020.
