= Bocanegra =

Bocanegra may refer to:

- Bocanegra (surname)
- SEAT 1200 Sport, a 1970s car popularly nicknamed Bocanegra
- SEAT Bocanegra, a 2008 concept car meant to recapture the spirit of the previous car
