= SEAT 850 =

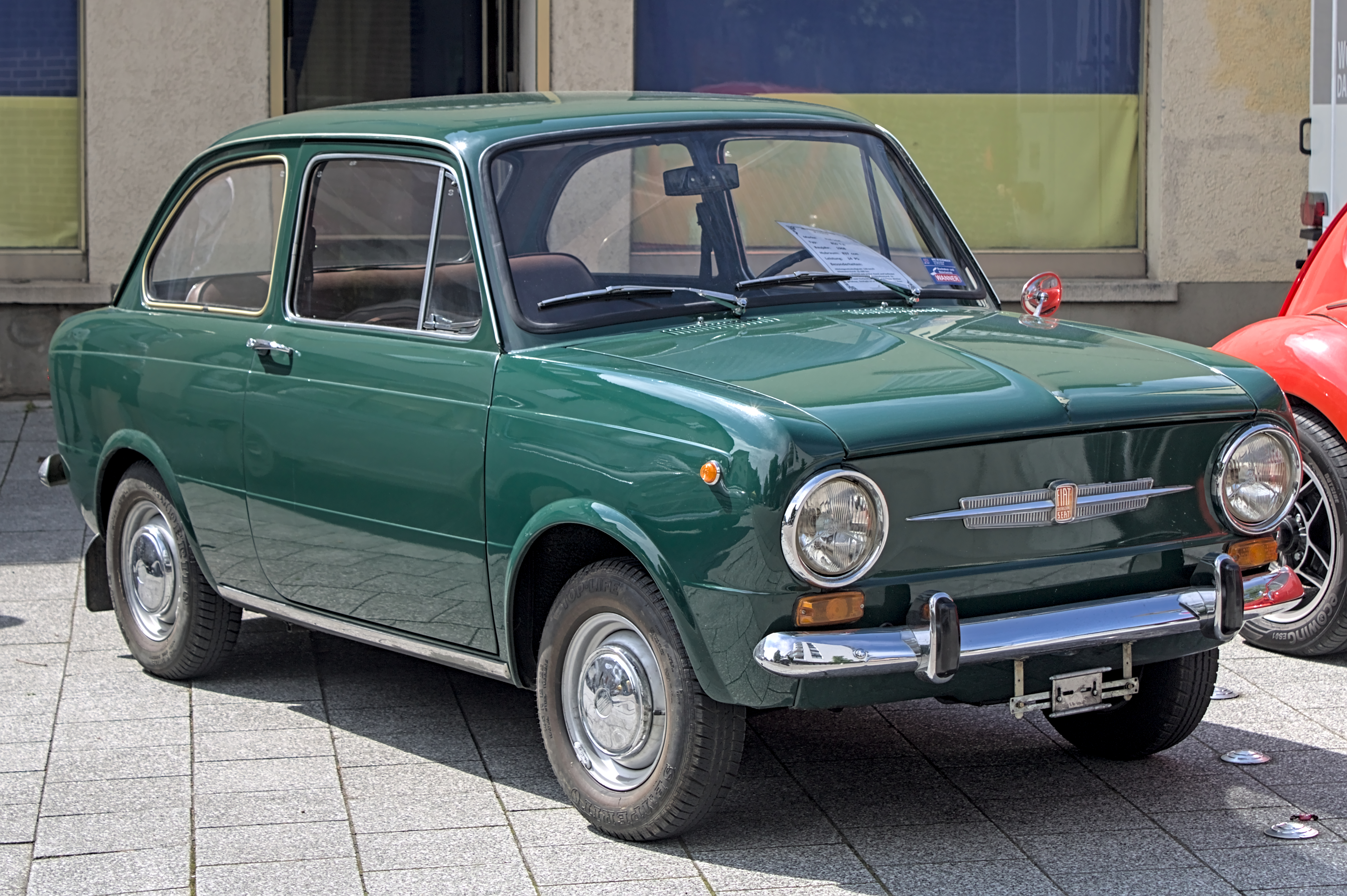
- 1968 SEAT 850 2-door sedan

Overview
- Manufacturer: SEAT
- Production: April 1966–1974; 664,346 built
- Assembly: Spain: Zona Franca, Barcelona (2-door saloon, Coupé & Spider); Spain: Tarrasa, Barcelona (4-door saloon largo; Carrocerías Costa)
- Designer: Dante Giacosa (2-door saloon); Antonio Amat (4-door saloon largo); Felice Mario Boano and Gian Paolo Boano (Coupé); Giorgetto Giugiaro at Bertone (Spider)

Body and chassis
- Class: subcompact (B)
- Layout: Rear-engine, rear-wheel-drive
- Related: Fiat 850; SEAT 133

Powertrain
- Engine: 843 cc I4; 903 cc I4 (Sport Coupé, Spider)
- Transmission: 4-speed manual

Dimensions
- Wheelbase: 2,027 mm (79.8 in)
- Length: 3,575 mm (140.7 in); 3,725 mm (146.7 in) (4-door)
- Width: 1,425 mm (56.1 in)
- Kerb weight: 650 kg (1,430 lb)

Chronology
- Successor: SEAT 133; SEAT 127; SEAT 1200 Sport (for SEAT 850 Sport)

The SEAT 850, also popularly known as "ocho y medio" ("eight and a half", 8.5), was a supermini produced by Spanish automaker SEAT and based on the Fiat 850. The car was produced in Spain from April 1966 to 1974 in four different body styles.

== History ==
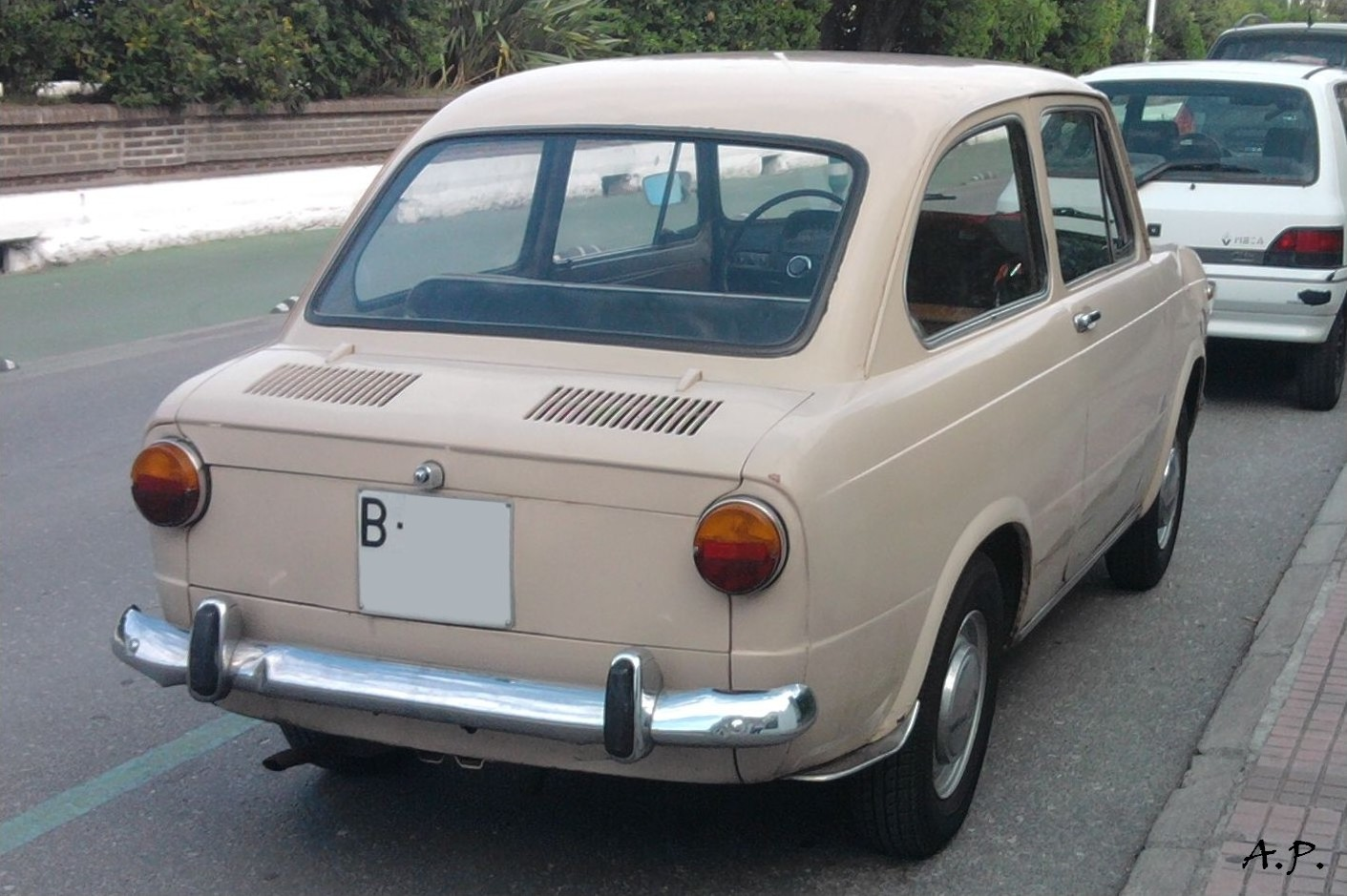
SEAT 850 2-door (rear view)

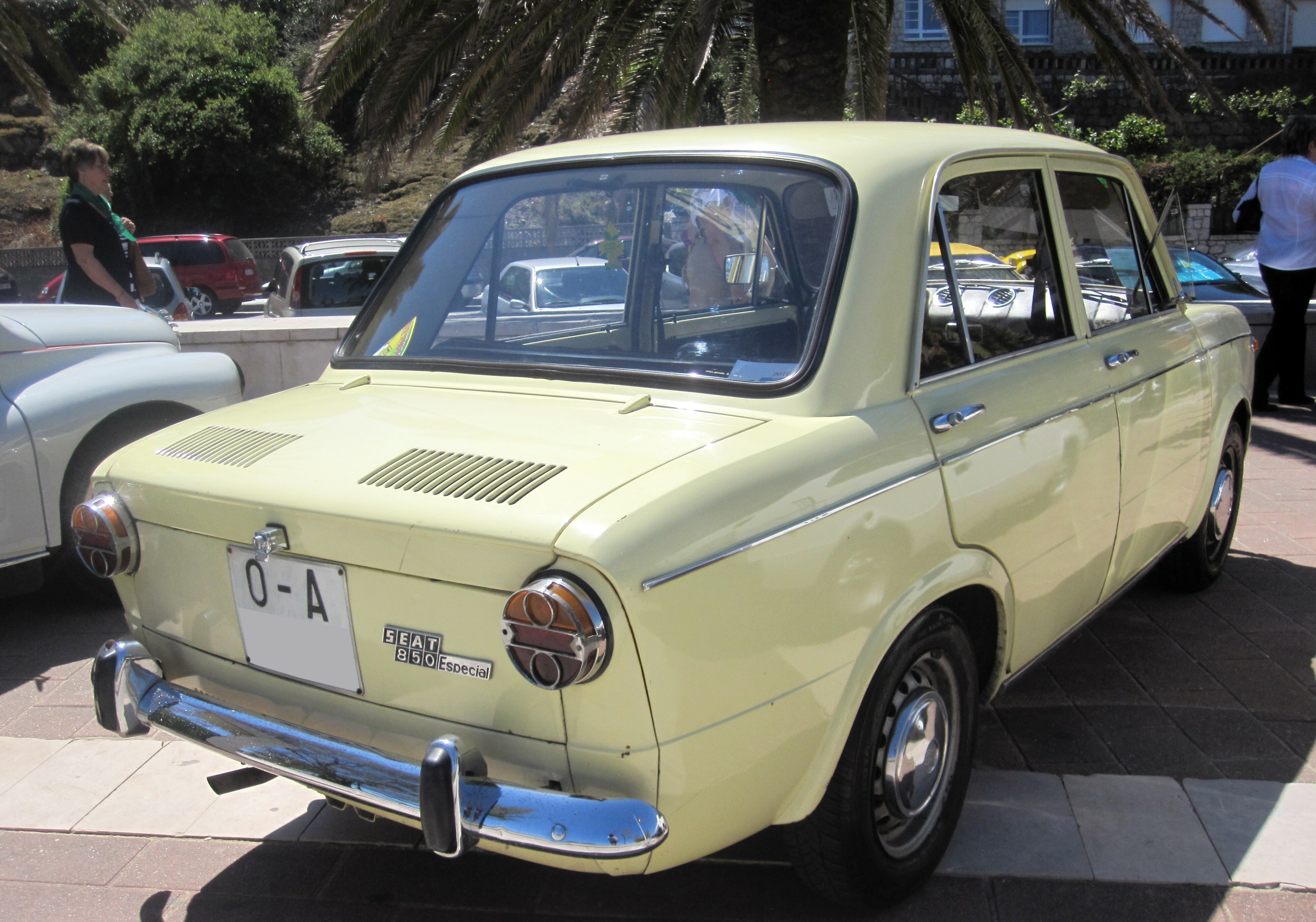
SEAT 850 Especial Lujo 4-door "largo" (rear view)

Originally only available with the same 2-door sedan body as used in Italy, two different 4-door versions also appeared in 1967. The very rare corto (short) used the bodywork developed by Francis Lombardi for the Fiat 850 "Lucciola", while the largo (long) version used a floorpan lengthened by 15 cm and bodywork developed specifically by Carrocerías Costa for SEAT.

At the 1971 Paris Motor Salon, the 850 Especial Lujo (Special deLuxe) was presented, only available with the 4-door largo body. Production ended in late 1974, having been replaced by the SEAT 133, essentially an 850 rebodied in the style of the 127. Sedans and the standard coupé received 843 cc four-cylinder engines with either 37 or 47 hp (27 or 35 kW). After Fiat 850 production ceased in Italy in 1972, the SEAT version was sold in European countries through Fiat dealers for a couple of years. These cars had a Fiat badge which had "costruzione SEAT" underneath it.

== SEAT 850 Sport ==
The SEAT 850 Sport model was based on the Fiat 850 Coupé and Spider versions and was also available in two variants:

- SEAT 850 Sport Spider, the convertible variant
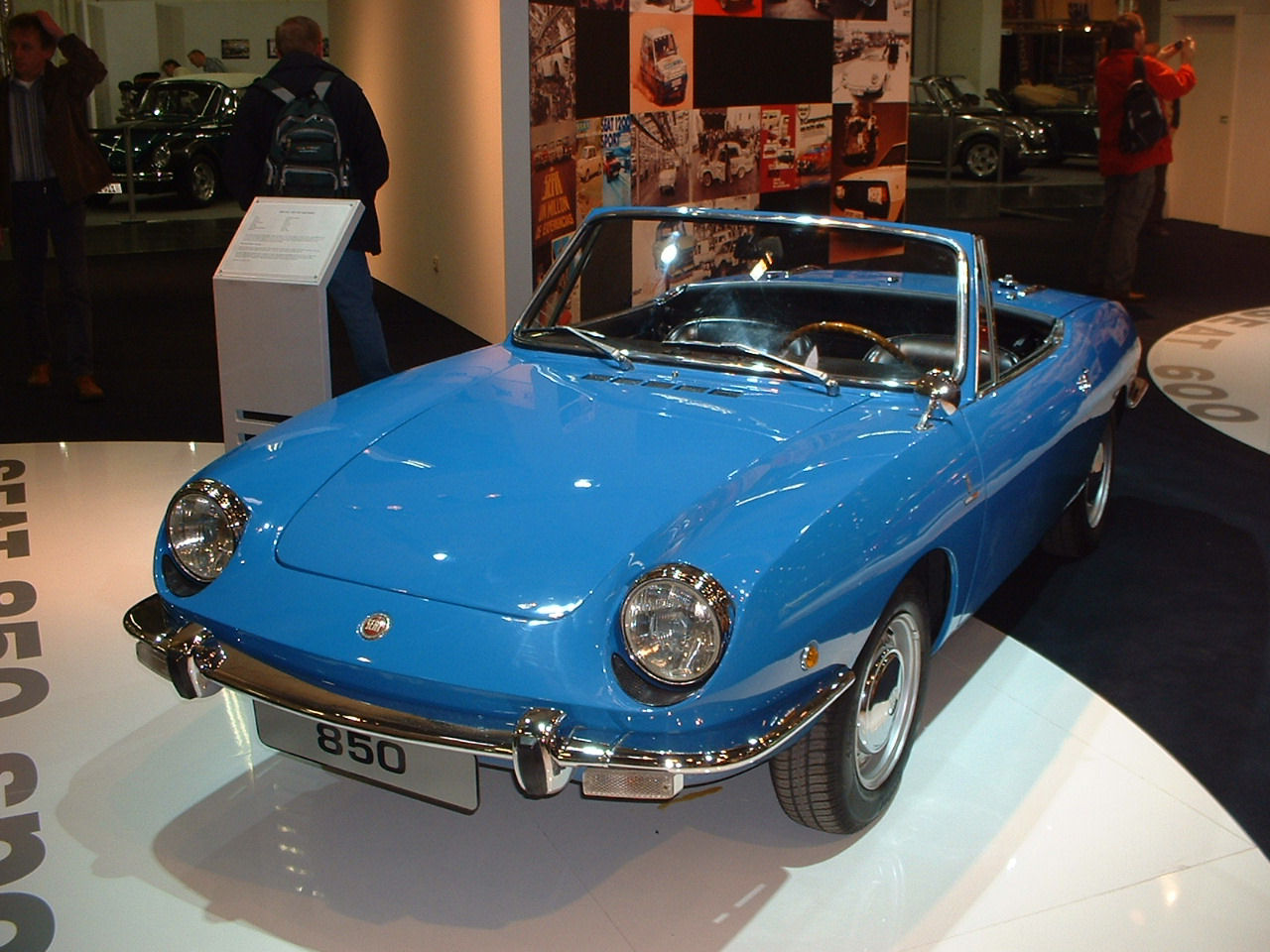
SEAT 850 Sport Spider

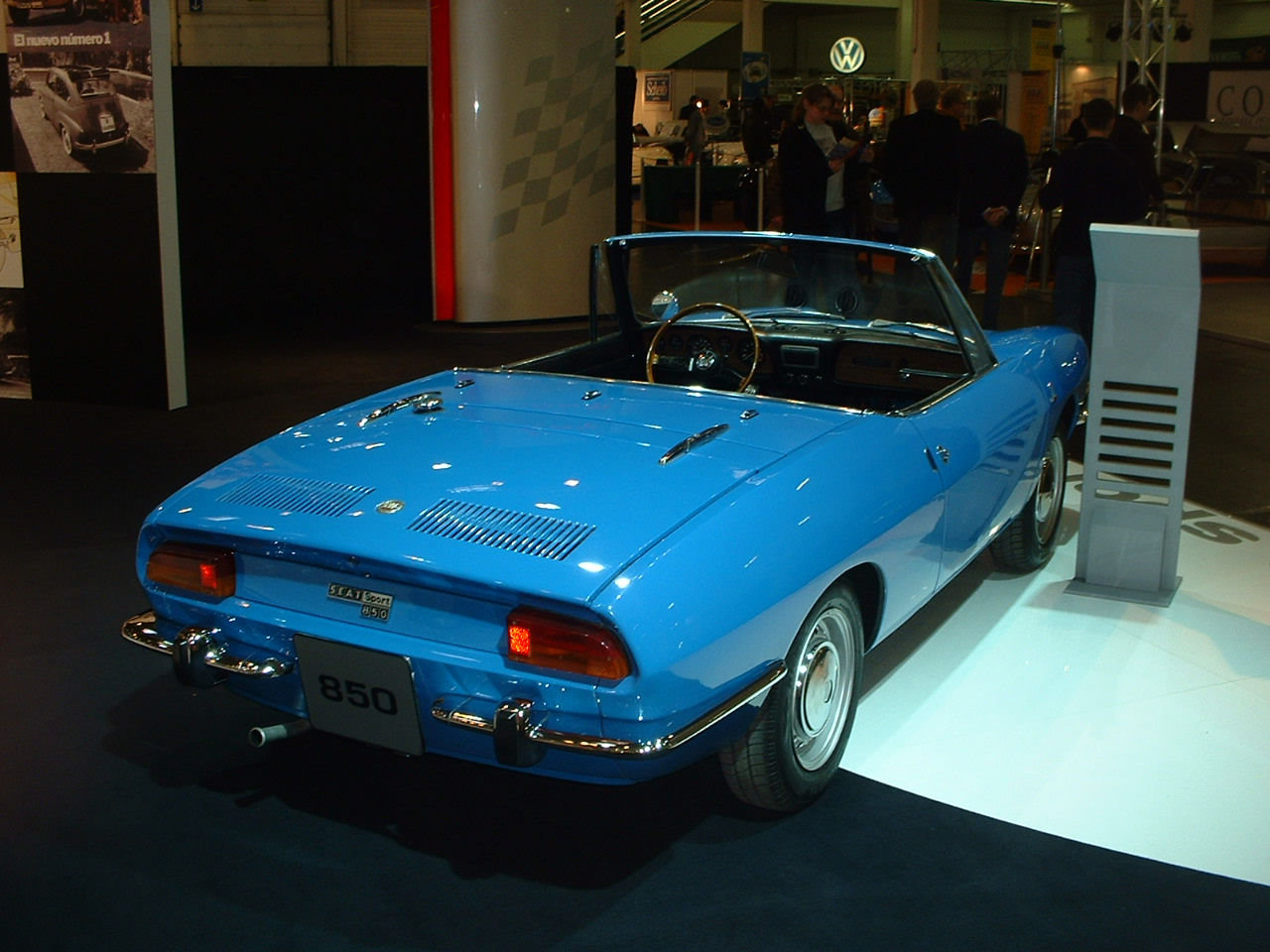
Rear view
- SEAT 850 Coupé and SEAT 850 Sport Coupé, the two model versions of the coupé variant
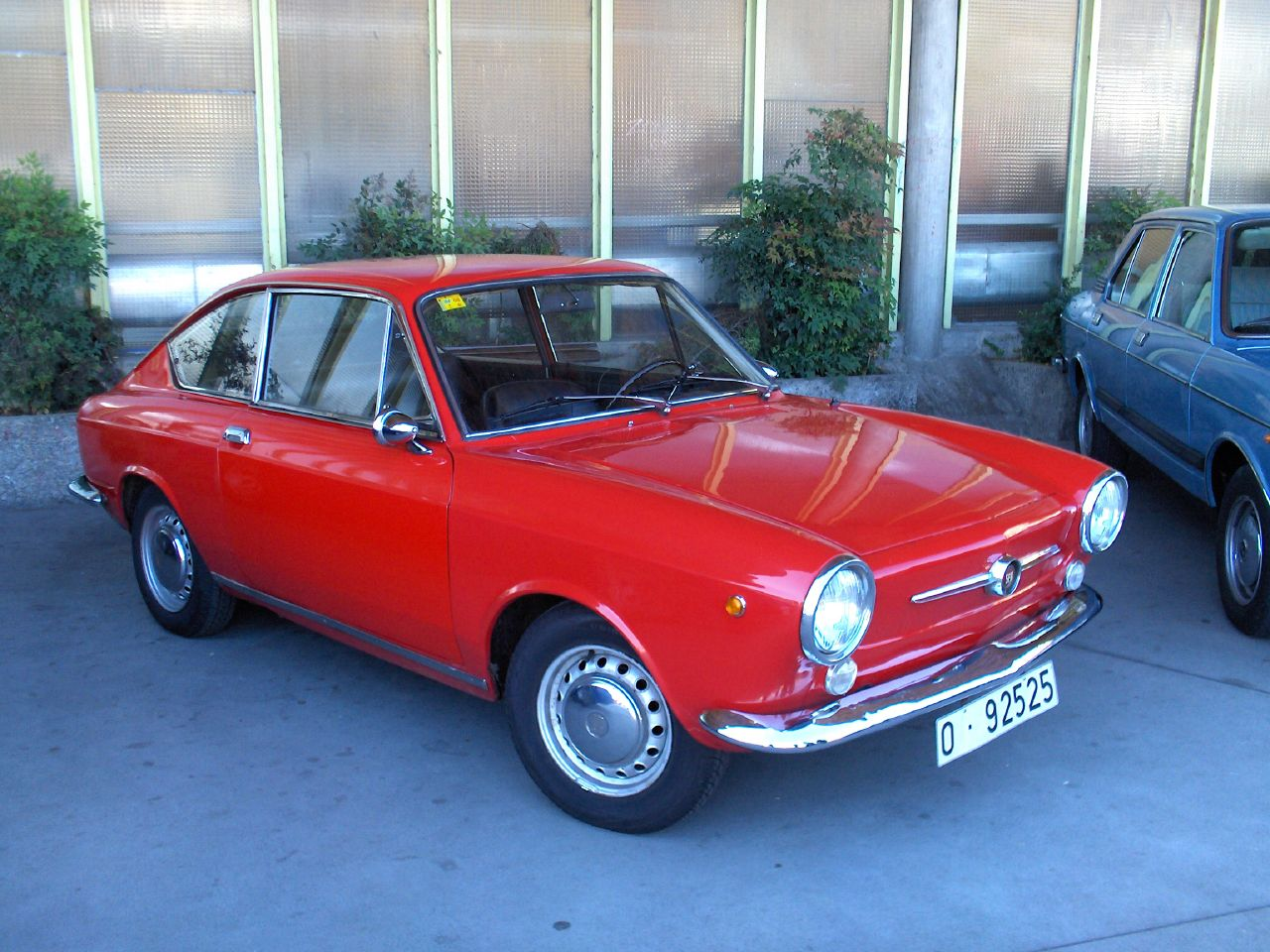
SEAT 850 Coupé (pre-facelift)

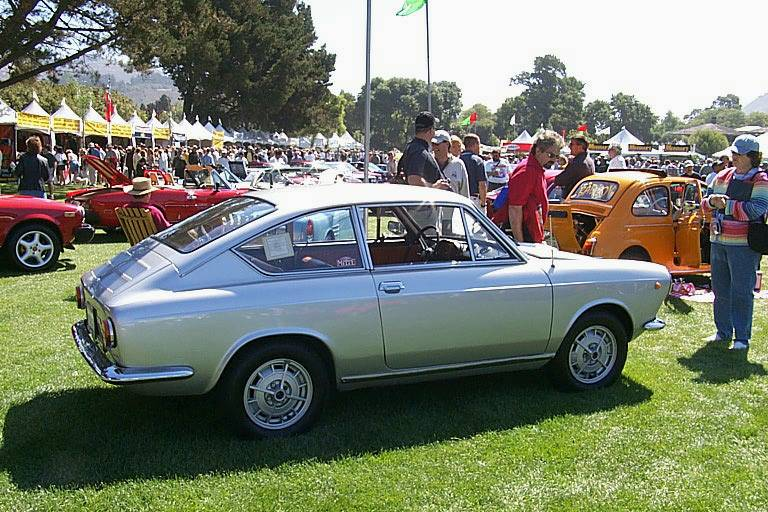
Rear view (pre-facelift)

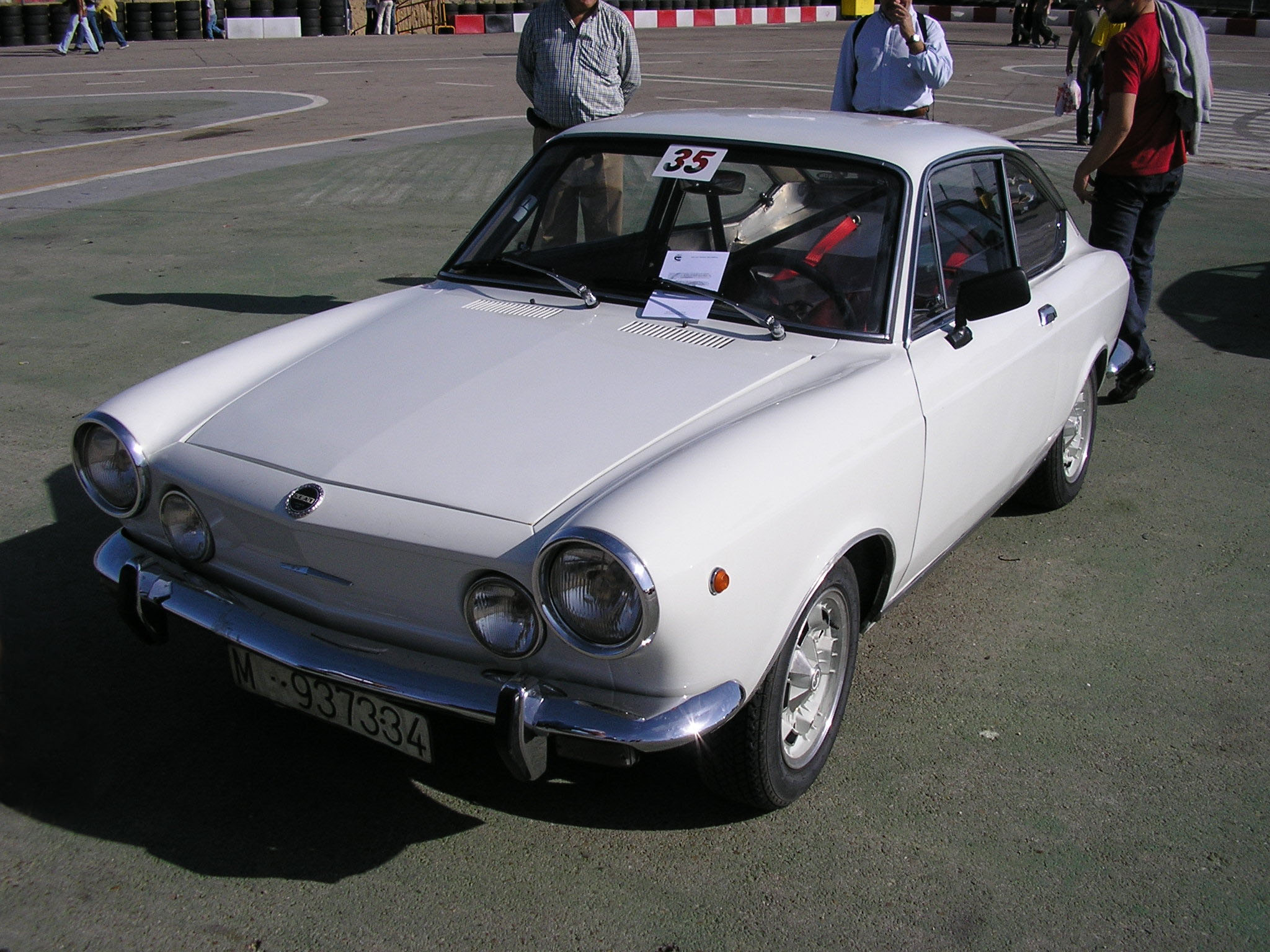
SEAT 850 Sport Coupé (facelift)

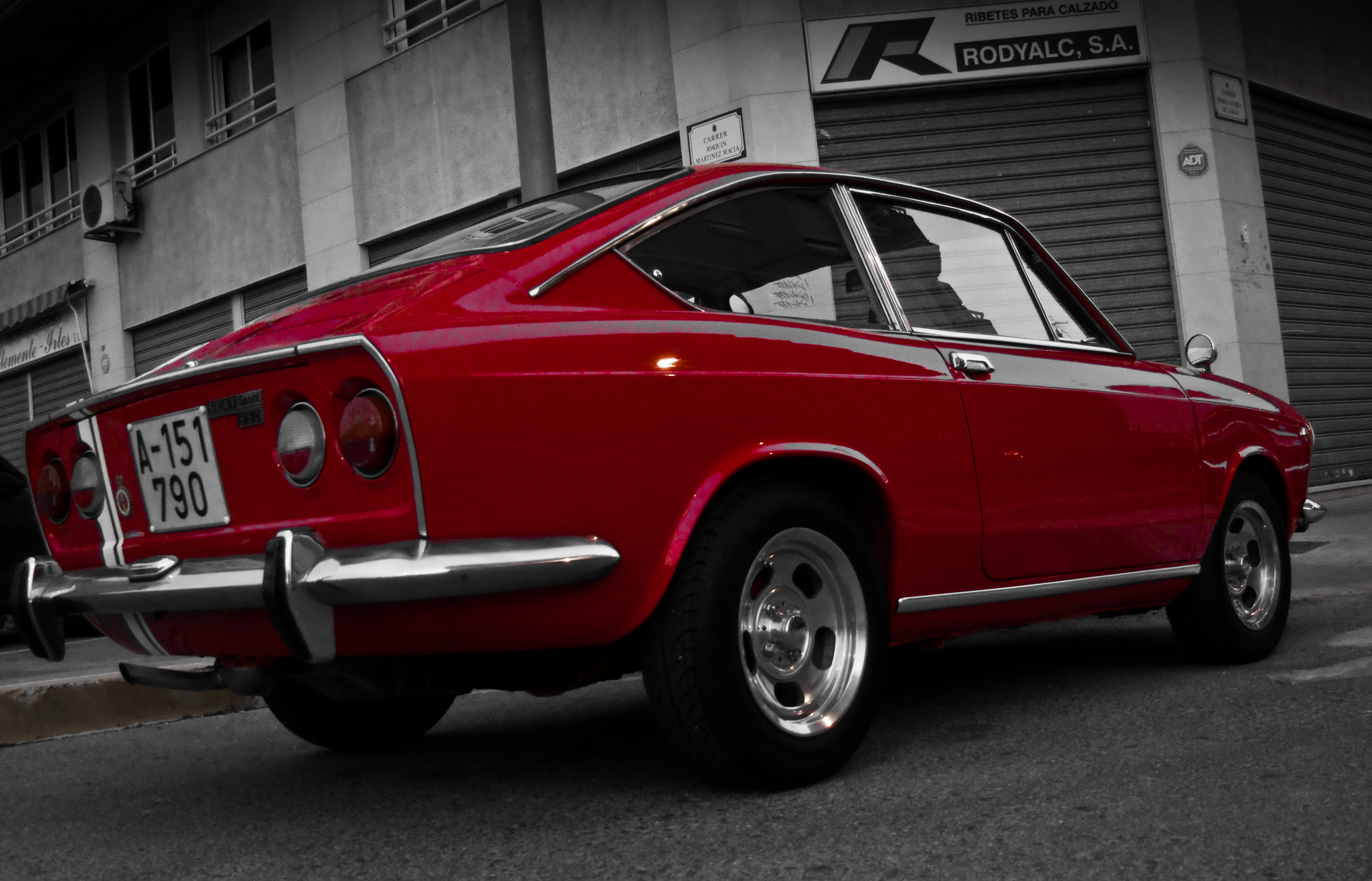
Rear view (facelift)

The Sport Coupé and Spider versions were also built in Spain, although they were never exported. They were equipped with a 51 hp (38 kW) 903 cc engine as opposed to the lower powered, 843 cc standard cars.

== Production figures ==
The total production per year of SEAT 850 cars is shown in the following table :

model	1966	1967	1968	1969	1970	1971	1972	1973	1974
SEAT 850 Total annual production	31,314	69,009	64,605	77,282	115,144	102,728	89,142	77,950	37,172
