= SEAT 127 =

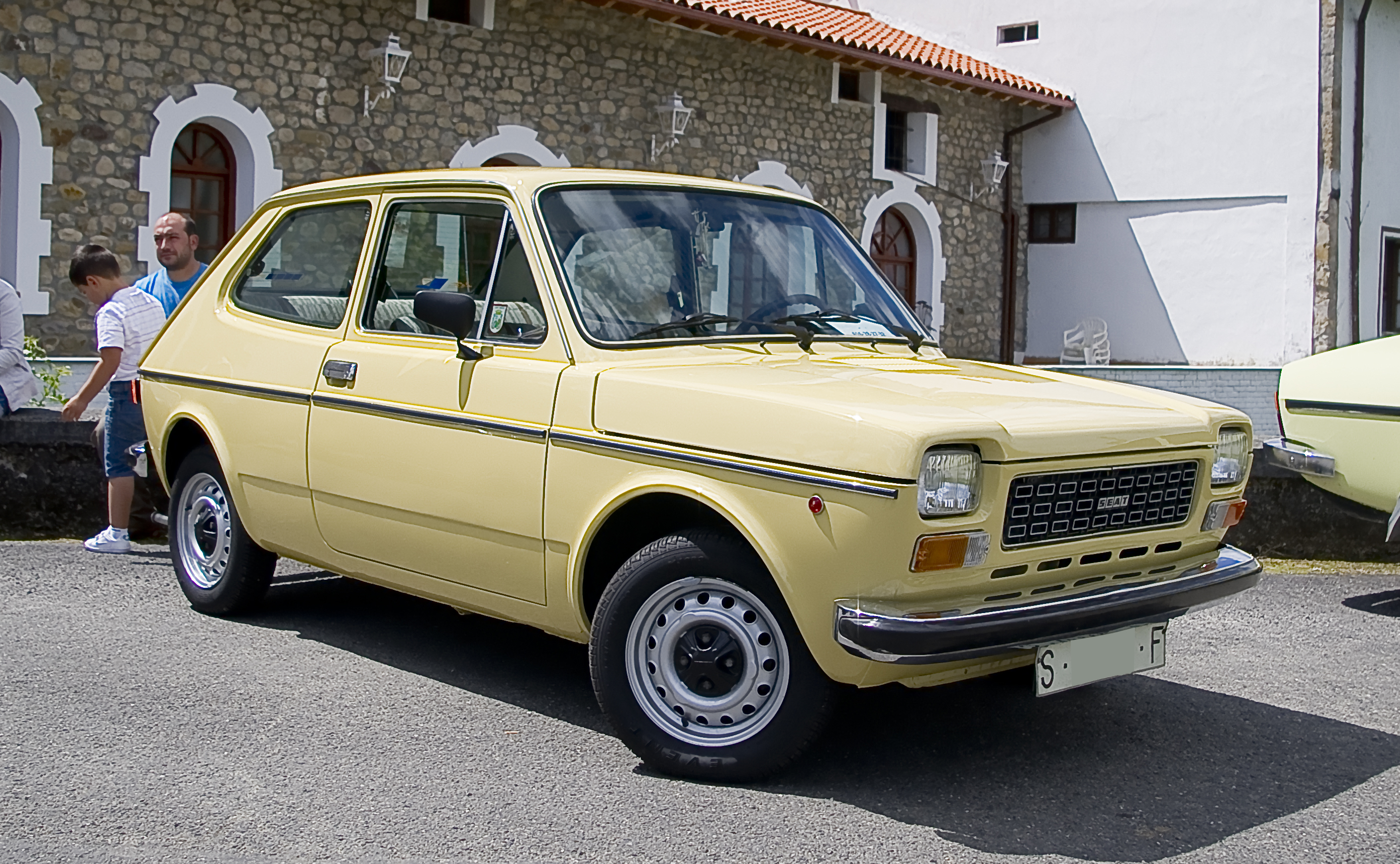
- 1977 SEAT 127 LS (First series)

Overview
- Manufacturer: SEAT
- Production: April 1972–1982
- Assembly: Spain: Barcelona (Zona Franca)

Body and chassis
- Class: subcompact (B)
- Body style: 3 and 5-door hatchback 2 and 4-door fastback saloon
- Related: Fiat 127; SEAT Fura; SEAT 1200 Sport

Powertrain
- Engine: 903 cc OHV I4; 1010 cc OHV I4
- Transmission: 4-speed manual

Chronology
- Predecessor: SEAT 850
- Successor: SEAT Fura

The SEAT 127 is a supermini produced by the Spanish automaker SEAT between the spring of 1972 and 1982, a rebadged Fiat 127 built in Spain. SEAT did also offer versions with rear side doors, which were never built in Italy. SEAT produced 1,238,166 units of the 127 between 1972 and 1982.

== Overview ==
=== First series (1972–1977) ===
Due to SEAT design policy, a four-door variant of the car (without a hatchback lid, in spite of the fastback roofline) was added to the lineup in 1973. While usually fitted with the same 903 cc engine as in the Fiat 127, SEAT also produced a unique variant of the 127 OHV engine. This had 1010 cc instead of 903 cc and produced 52 PS (38 kW) rather than the 43 or 45 PS (32 or 33 kW) of the smaller unit.

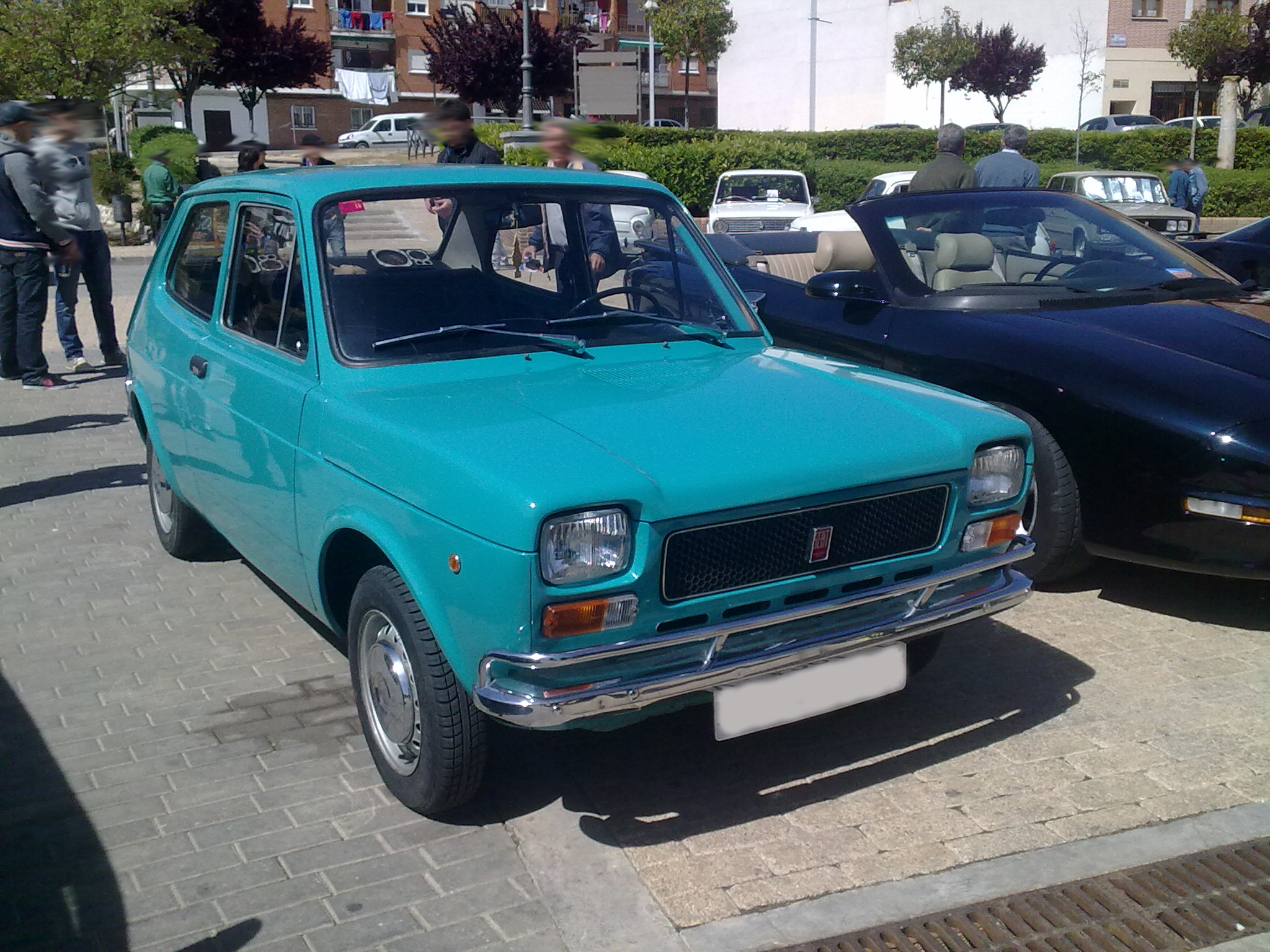
SEAT 127 2-doors

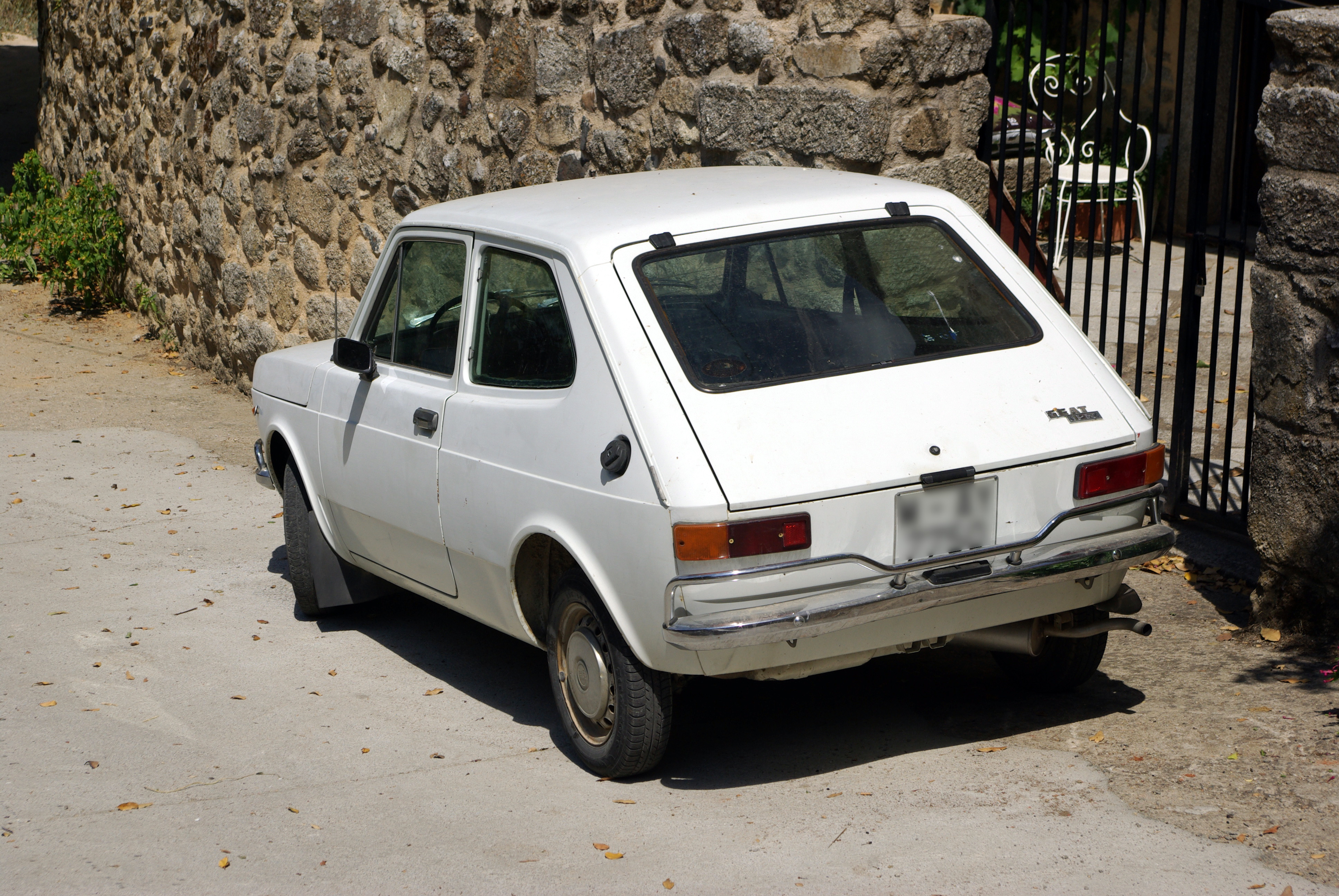
SEAT 127 3-doors (rear view)

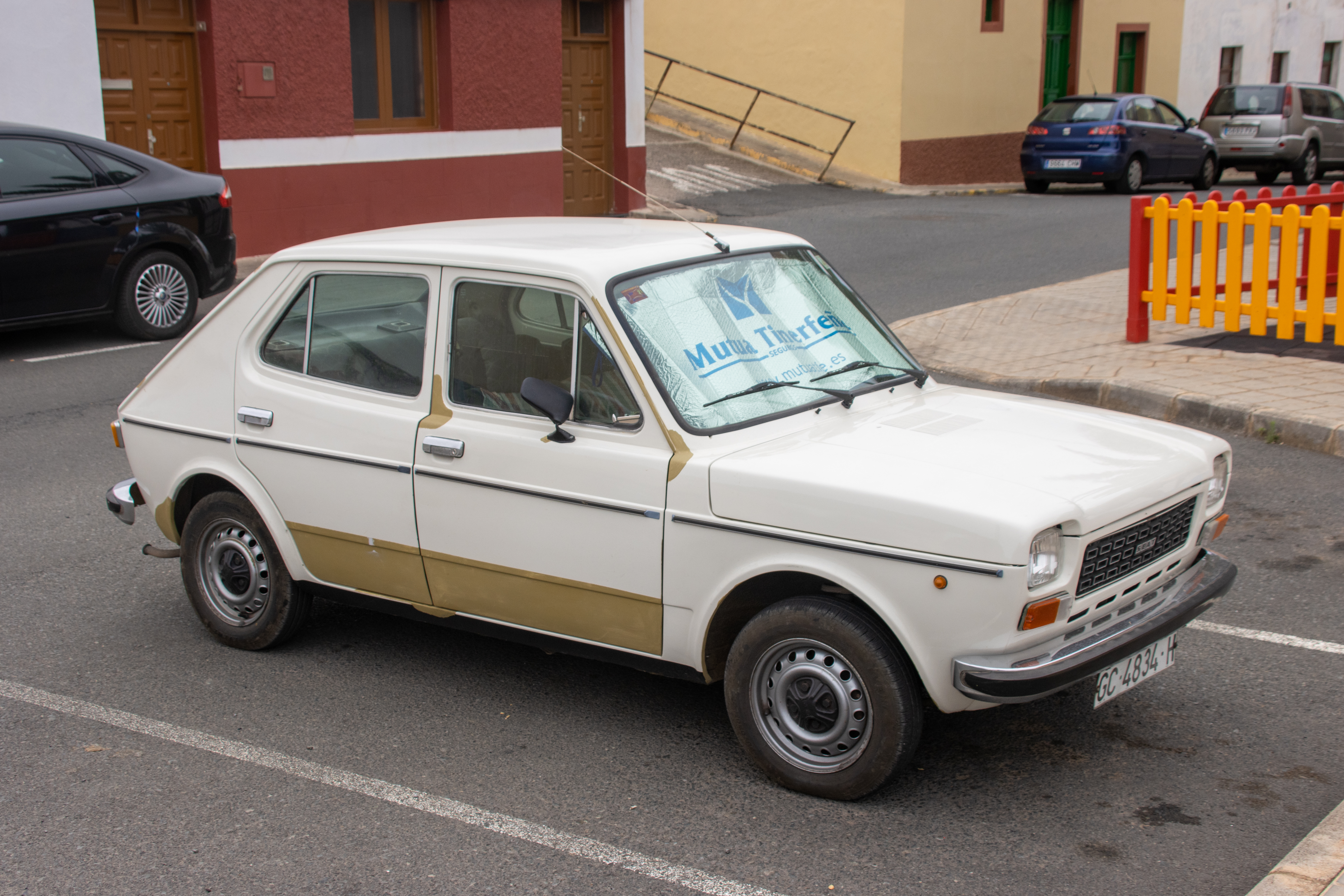
SEAT 127 LS 4-doors

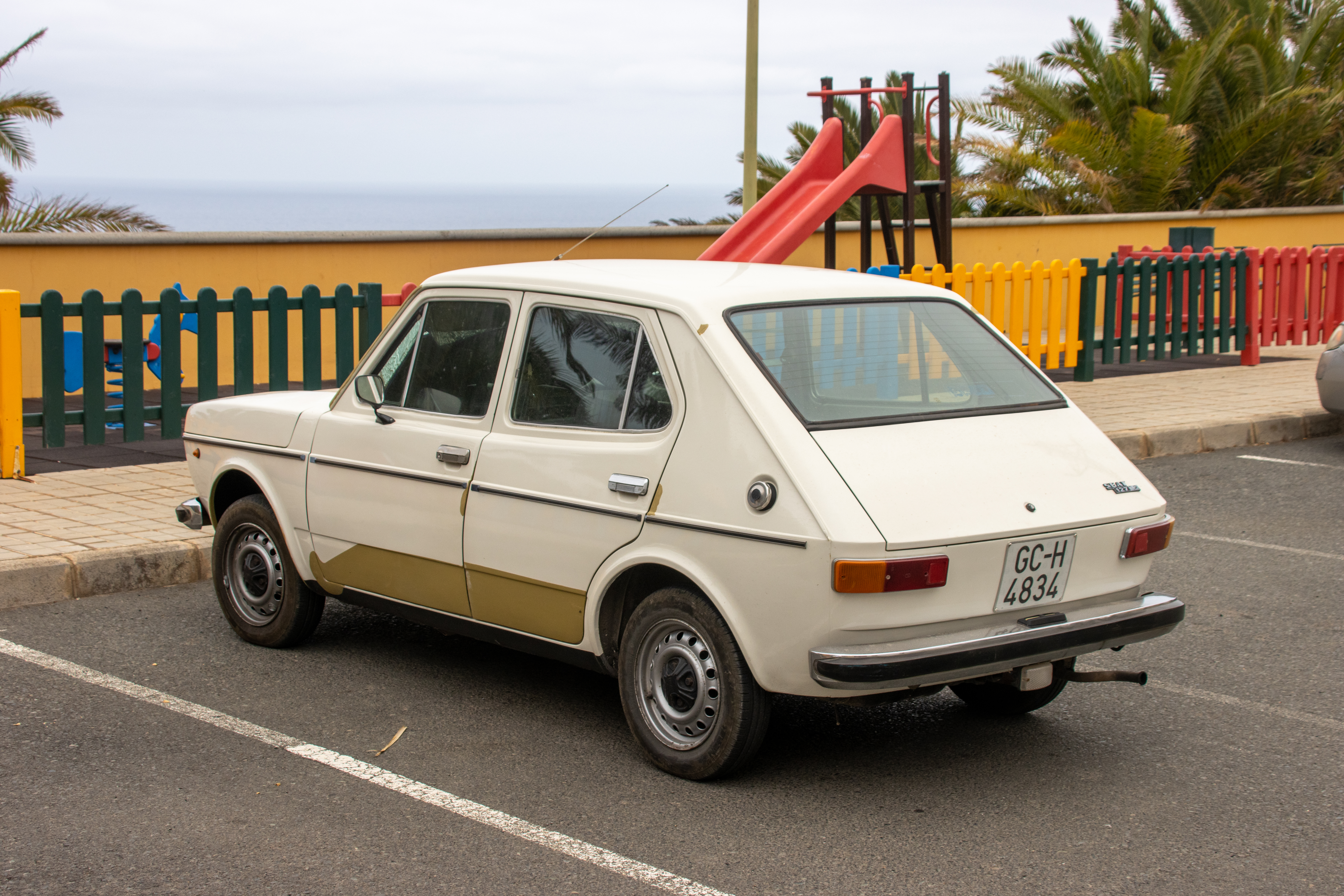
SEAT 127 LS 4-doors (rear view)

=== Second series (1977–1982) ===
The SEAT 127 underwent the same styling modifications as did the Fiat 127 (new grille, taillights, bumpers) for the Serie 2, of January 1980. At the same time, a full five-door hatchback bodywork also became available.

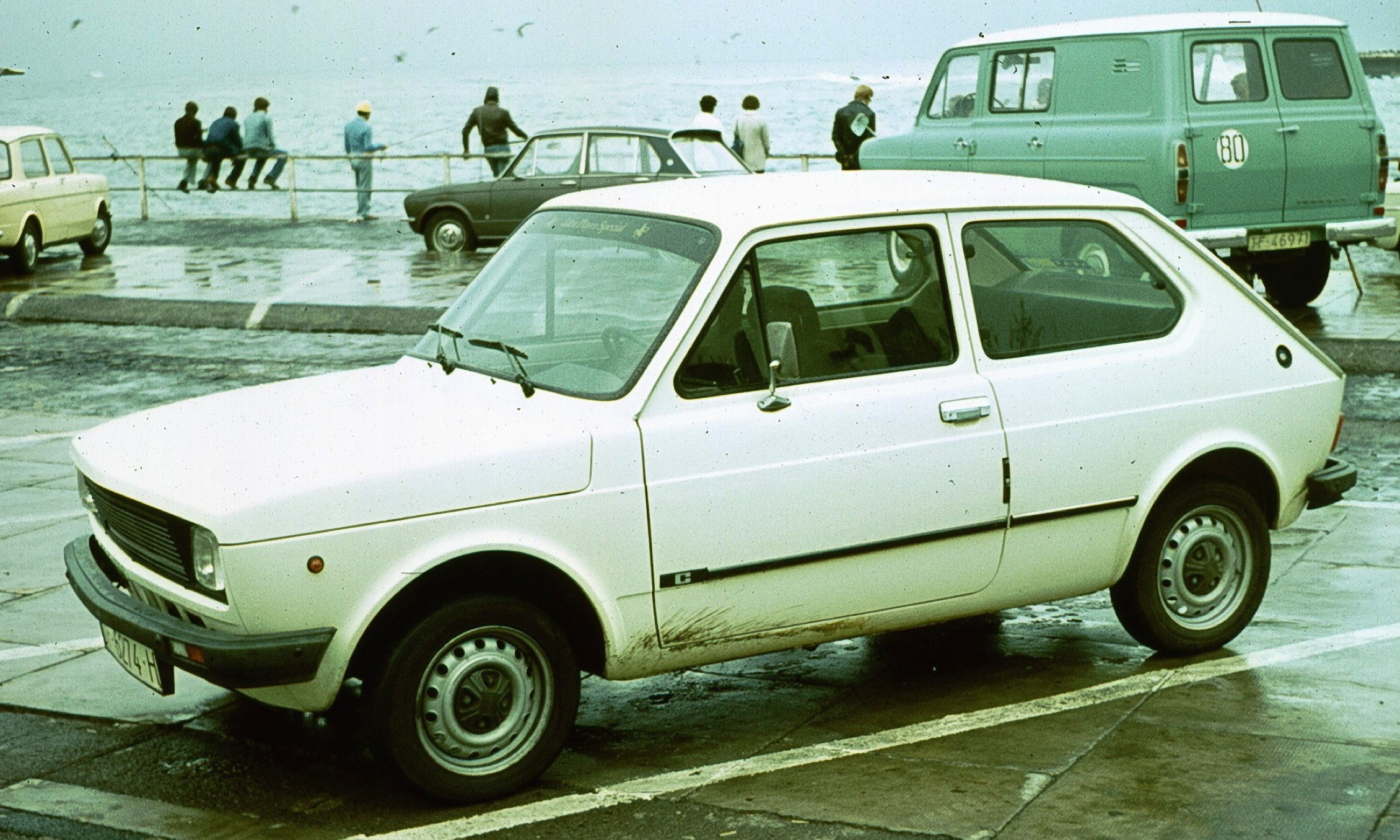
SEAT 127 serie II 2-doors

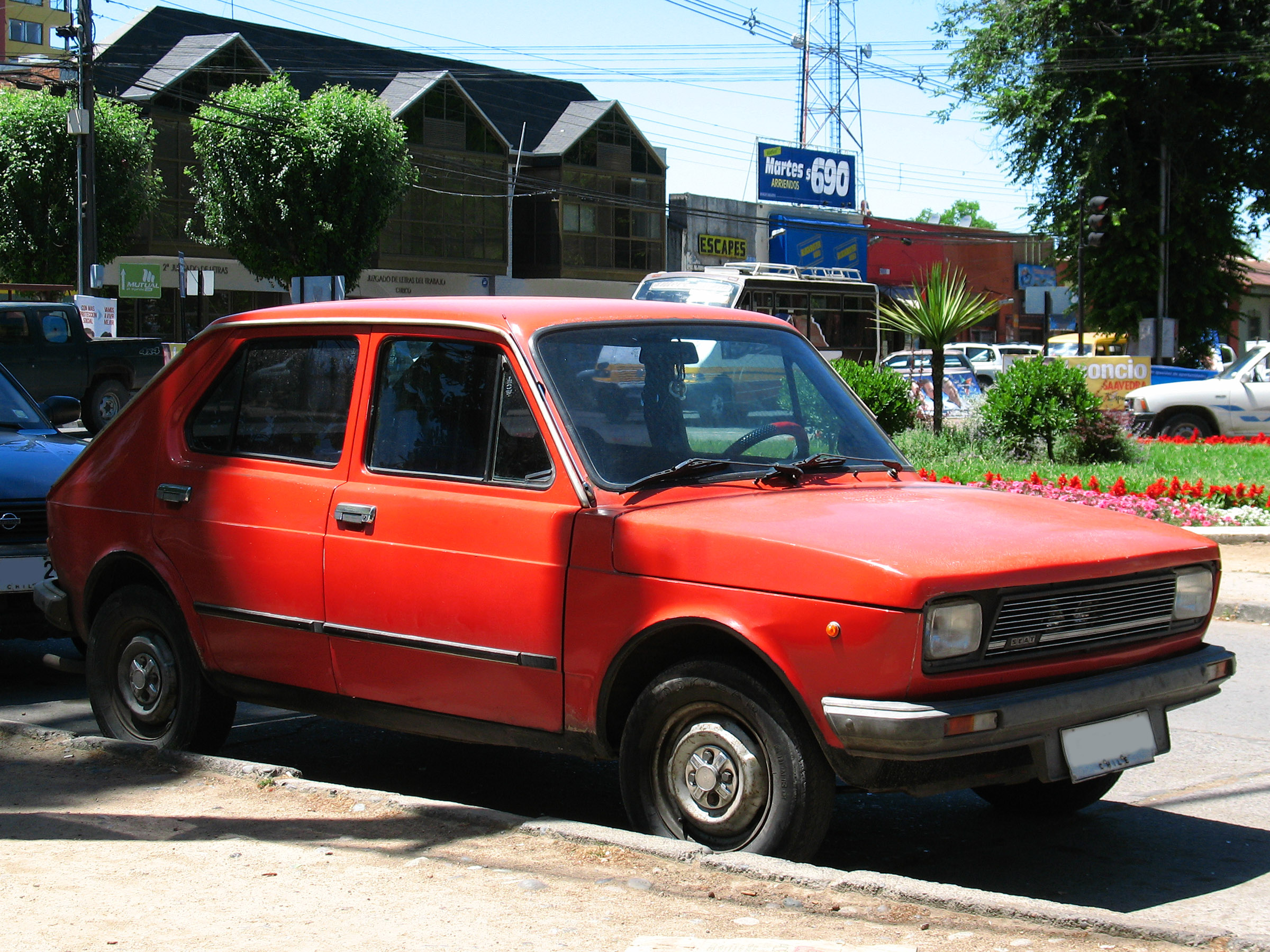
SEAT 127 serie II 5-doors

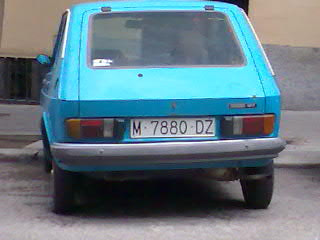
SEAT 127 serie II (rear view)

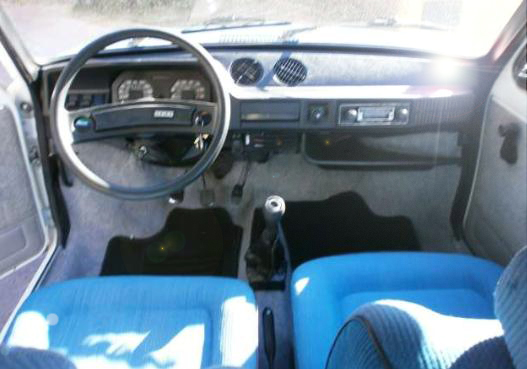
127 CL interior

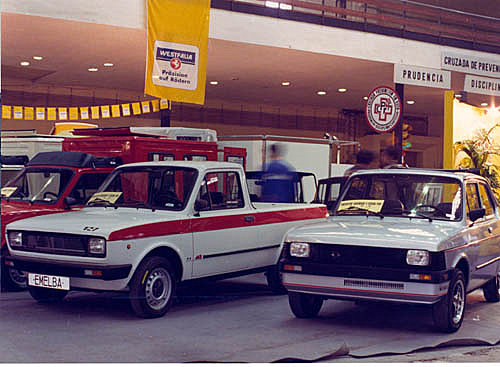
Emelba 127 Pick Up (left)

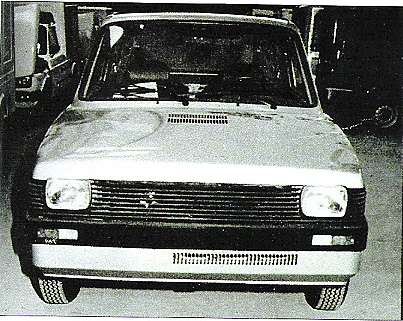
Emelba 127 Elba

=== Third series (1981–1986) ===
In November 1981, the last evolution of the SEAT 127 was presented as "SEAT 127 Fura". The 127 Fura was nearly identical to the Italian Fiat 127 series 3 (third series). When their licence from Fiat expired, SEAT redesigned some parts of the car and renamed it the SEAT Fura.
