= SEAT 1200 Sport =

SEAT 1200 / 1430 Sport
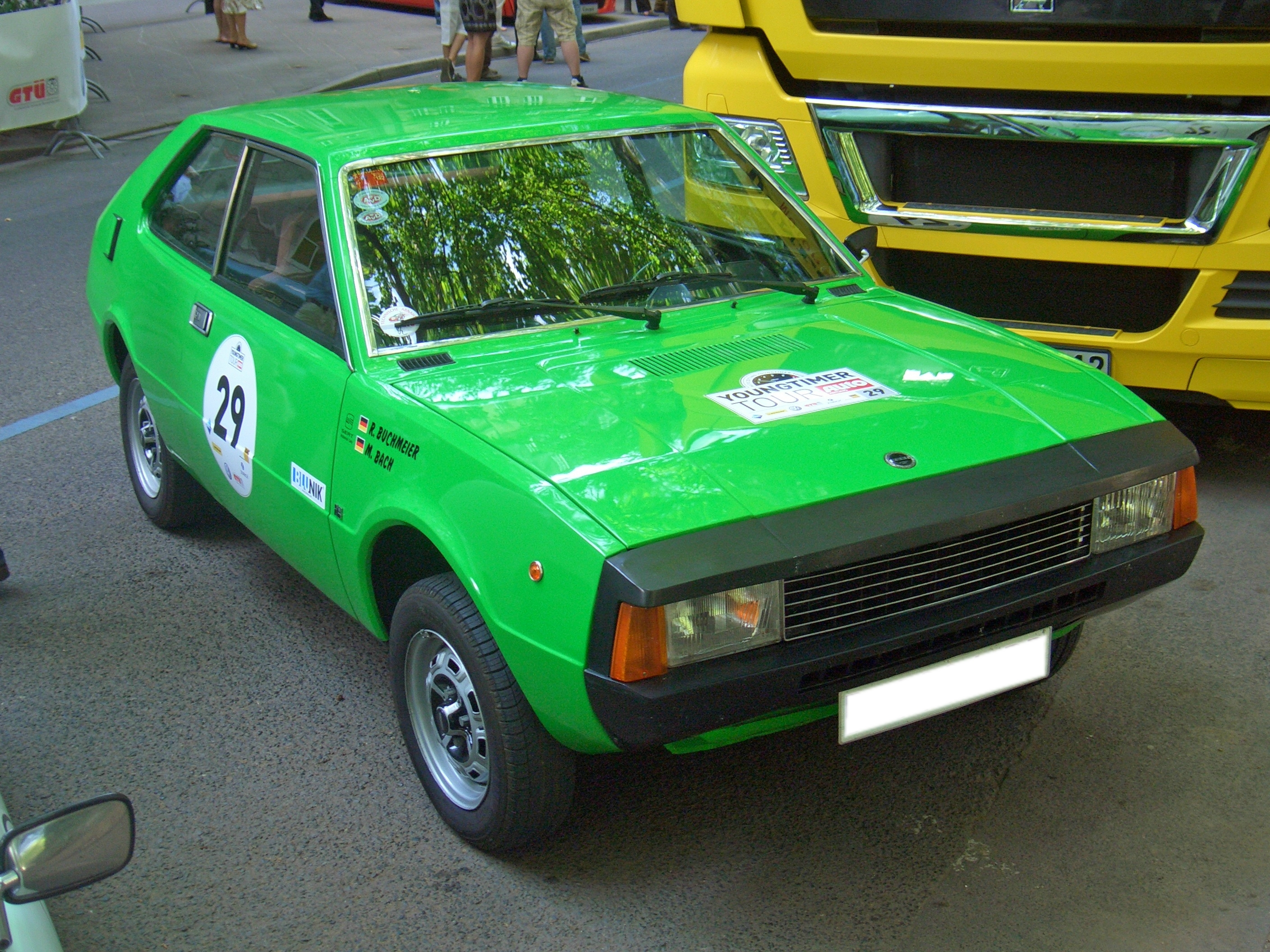
- SEAT 1200 Sport

Overview
- Manufacturer: Inducar (SEAT)
- Also called: SEAT 1430 Sport Coupé (1,438-cc engine, 1977–1979)
- Production: February 1976 – September 1979; 19,332 built
- Assembly: Spain: Terrasa
- Designer: Aldo Sessano

Body and chassis
- Body style: 2+2 coupé
- Related: SEAT 127; FIAT 127

Powertrain
- Engine: 1,197 cc OHV I4; 1,438 cc OHV I4
- Transmission: 4-speed manual

Dimensions
- Wheelbase: 2,225 mm (87.6 in)
- Length: 3,665 mm (144.3 in)
- Width: 1,555 mm (61.2 in)
- Height: 1,250 mm (49.2 in)
- Curb weight: 805–815 kg (1,775–1,797 lb)

Chronology
- Predecessor: SEAT 850 Sport Coupé
- Successor: SEAT Fura Crono (indirect)

The SEAT 1200 Sport is a two-door, four-seater coupé developed by the Spanish car maker SEAT. First presented in December 1975, and sold commercially from February 1976 to September 1979. The SEAT Sport was, along with the SEAT 133, the first car developed entirely in the company's newly opened Martorell Technical Centre.

== Overview ==
=== SEAT 1200 Sport Coupé (1975–1977) ===
After the German brand NSU abandoned its plans to launch the NSU Nergal, its own small sports car based on the rear-engined NSU Prinz, presented as a prototype in the 1970 Turin Motor Show and designed by Italian designer Aldo Sessano; Antoni Amat, technical director of Inducar (Industrias de la Carrocería, an external provider for SEAT) proposed the 1200 Sport project to SEAT, with the mediation of Günter Óistrach, after the former's visit and contacts at the Turin Motor Show. The Terrassa-based Inducar company undertook the production of the car's chassis. To fit the platform SEAT planned for the car, the Nergal design was modified to include elements of another of Sessano's concept cars, the OTAS KL112, as it was based on the Fiat 127. A characteristic of the original NSU Nergal design that remained in the production model was the air-vents in the third pillar, just above the rear wheel arch, likely indicating the presence of the rear-mounted engine in NSU's design. SEAT's engineers examined the possibility of keeping the rear-engine layout, but ultimately chose a front engine. The car's boot featured remote opening through a handle on the driver's door, and had a capacity of 339 litres.

Its initial version was powered by the bigger 1,197 cc engine of 67 PS (49 kW) (developed for the SEAT 124), transversely mounted and canted forward by 16°, giving the little 2+2 a top speed of 157 km/h (98 mph) via its four-speed gearbox transmission. Despite its sporting aspirations, its power output was limited by a relatively low compression ratio, reflecting the fuel octane levels available in its home market. The 1200 Sport's sharp-edged body design had a drag coefficient (c_{d}) of 0.37.

=== SEAT 1430 Sport Coupé (1977–1979) ===
In 1977, the SEAT 1430 Sport Coupé was introduced, using the same body, but with a tuned version of the engine from the SEAT 1430. In this application, the 1,438-cc engine provided a power output of 77 PS (57 kW) and a top speed of 164 km/h (102 mph).

The Sport versions were offered mainly in the Spanish market, but also some cars were officially offered in other European countries such as Germany, Holland, Belgium, and France. Both models, 1200 and 1430, were discontinued in 1979, along with the SEAT 128, SEAT 133, and CKD-built Lancia Beta and Beta HPE, as part of the important restructuring of the SEAT range for 1980. A total of 19,332 units was sold in the Spanish market, with 11,619 cars being equipped with the 1200 engine and some 7,713 units with the more powerful but late-launched 1430 motor.

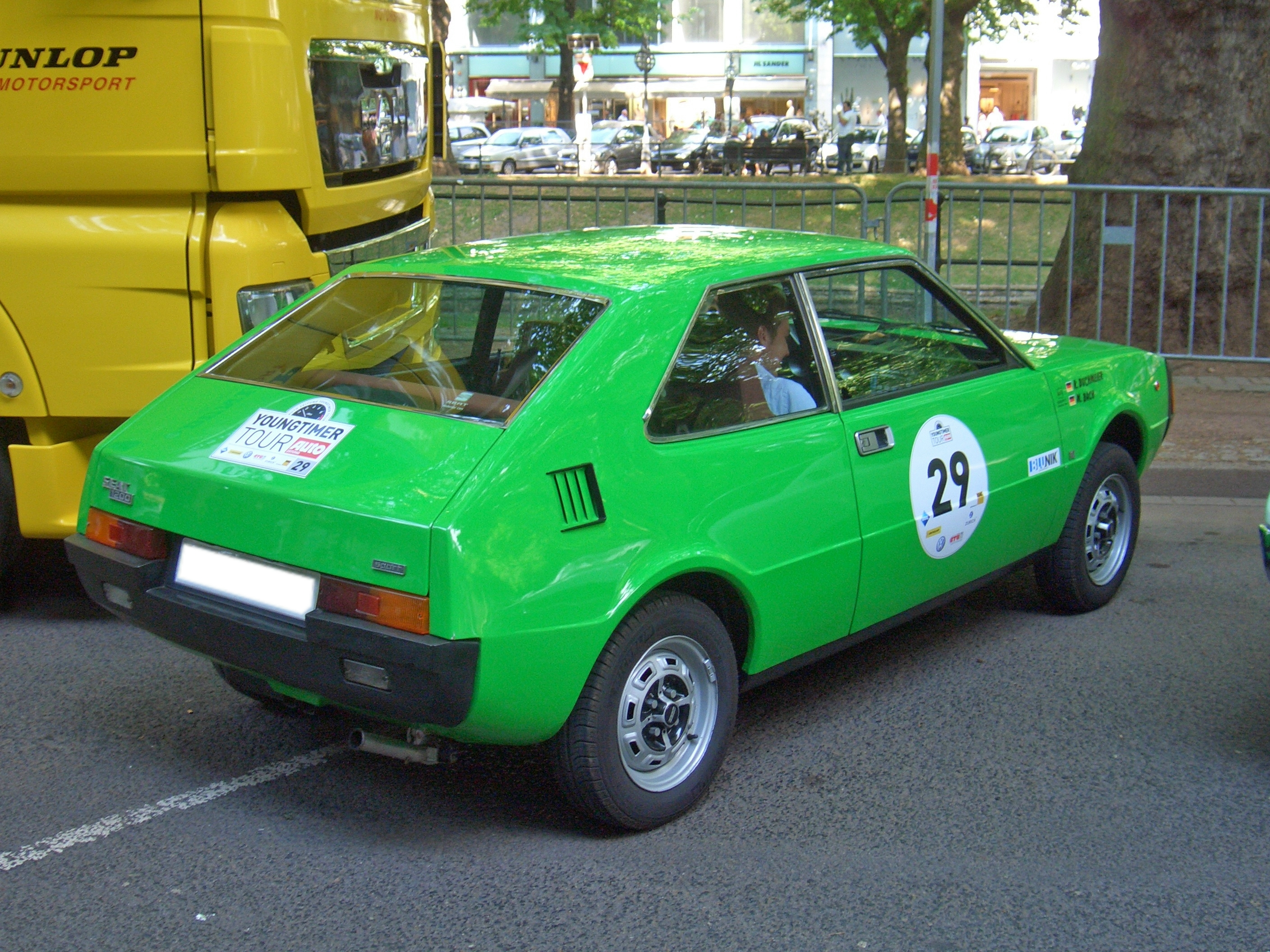
SEAT 1200 Sport (rear view)

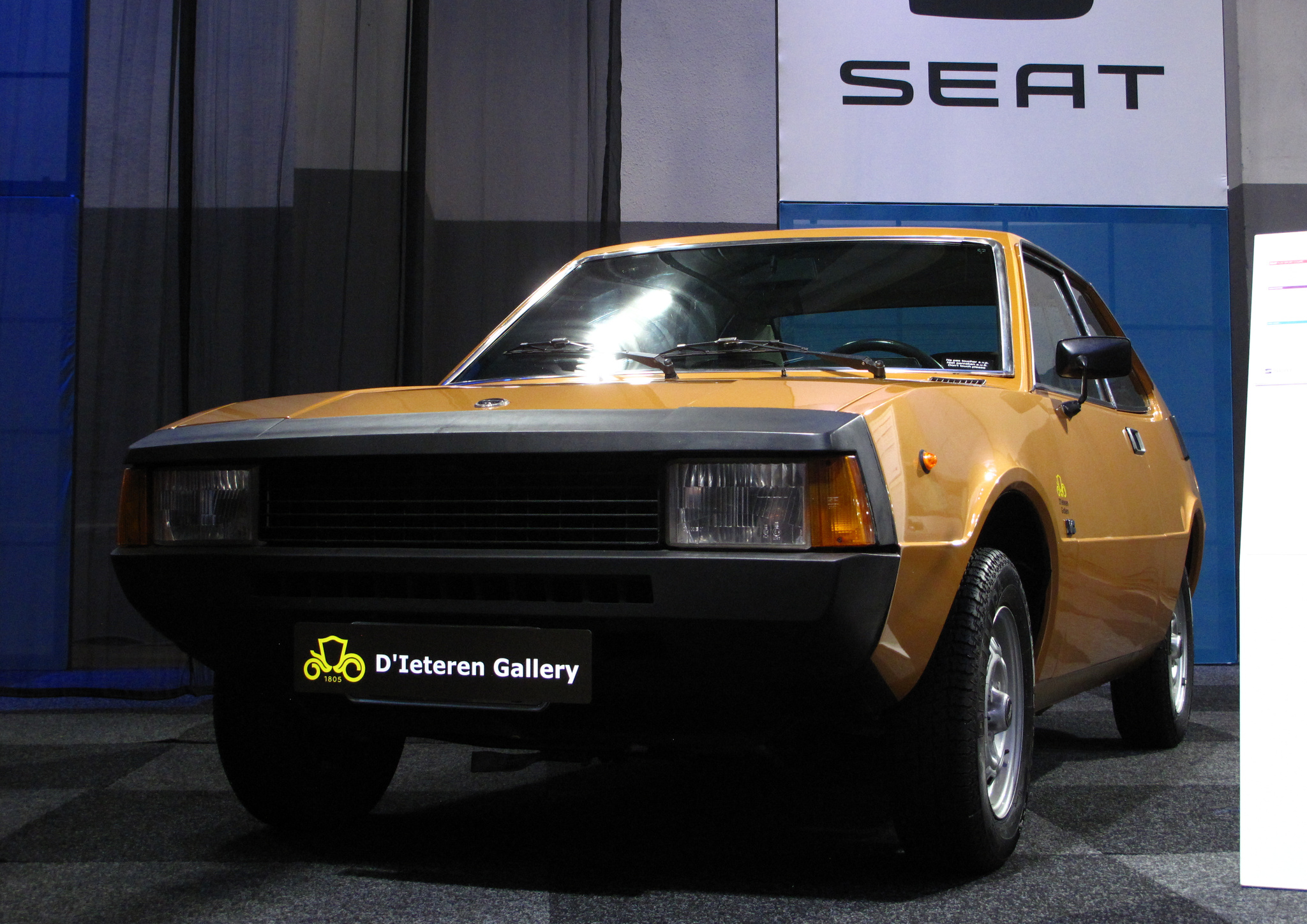
SEAT 1430 Sport

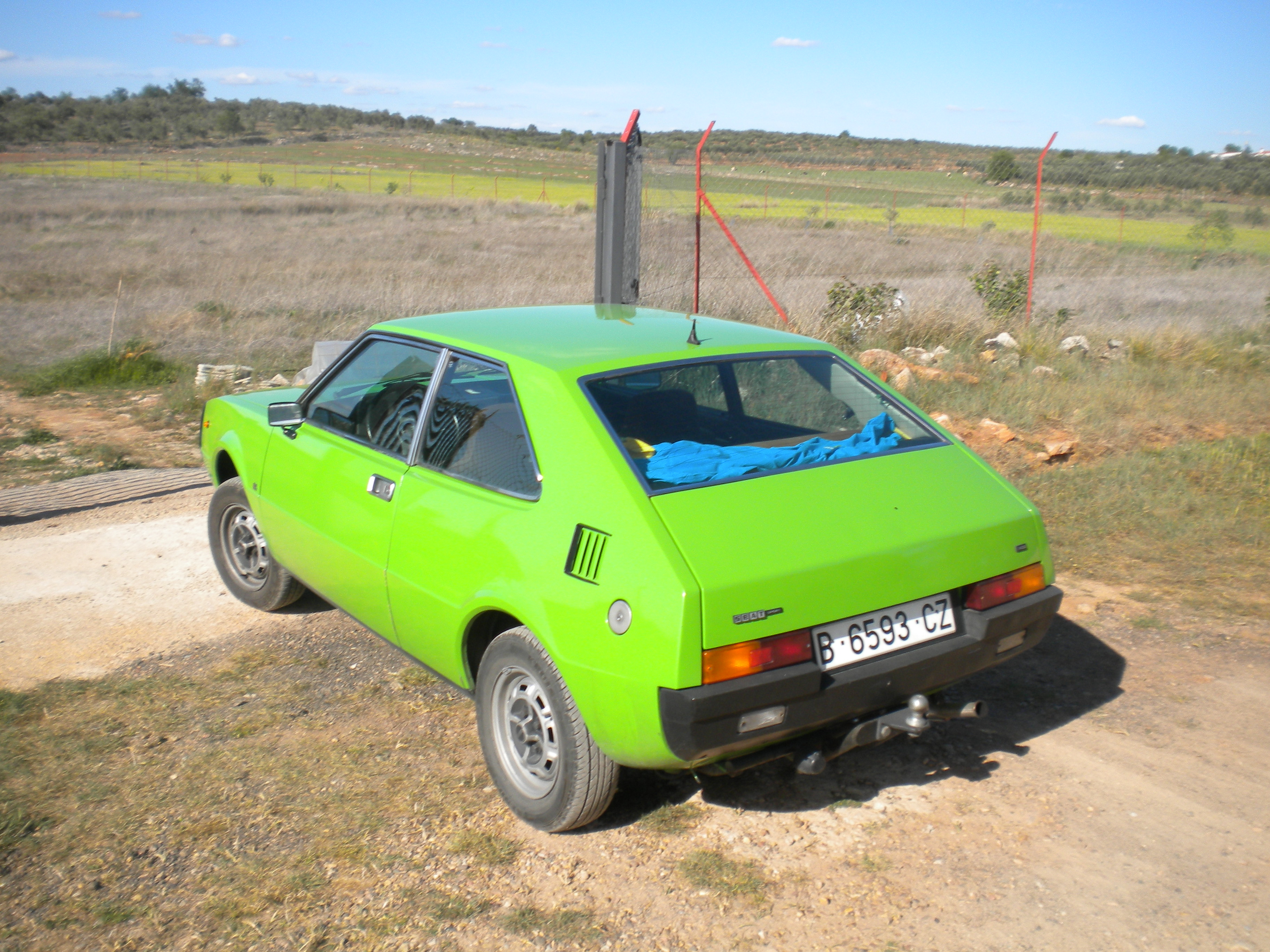
SEAT 1430 Sport (rear view)

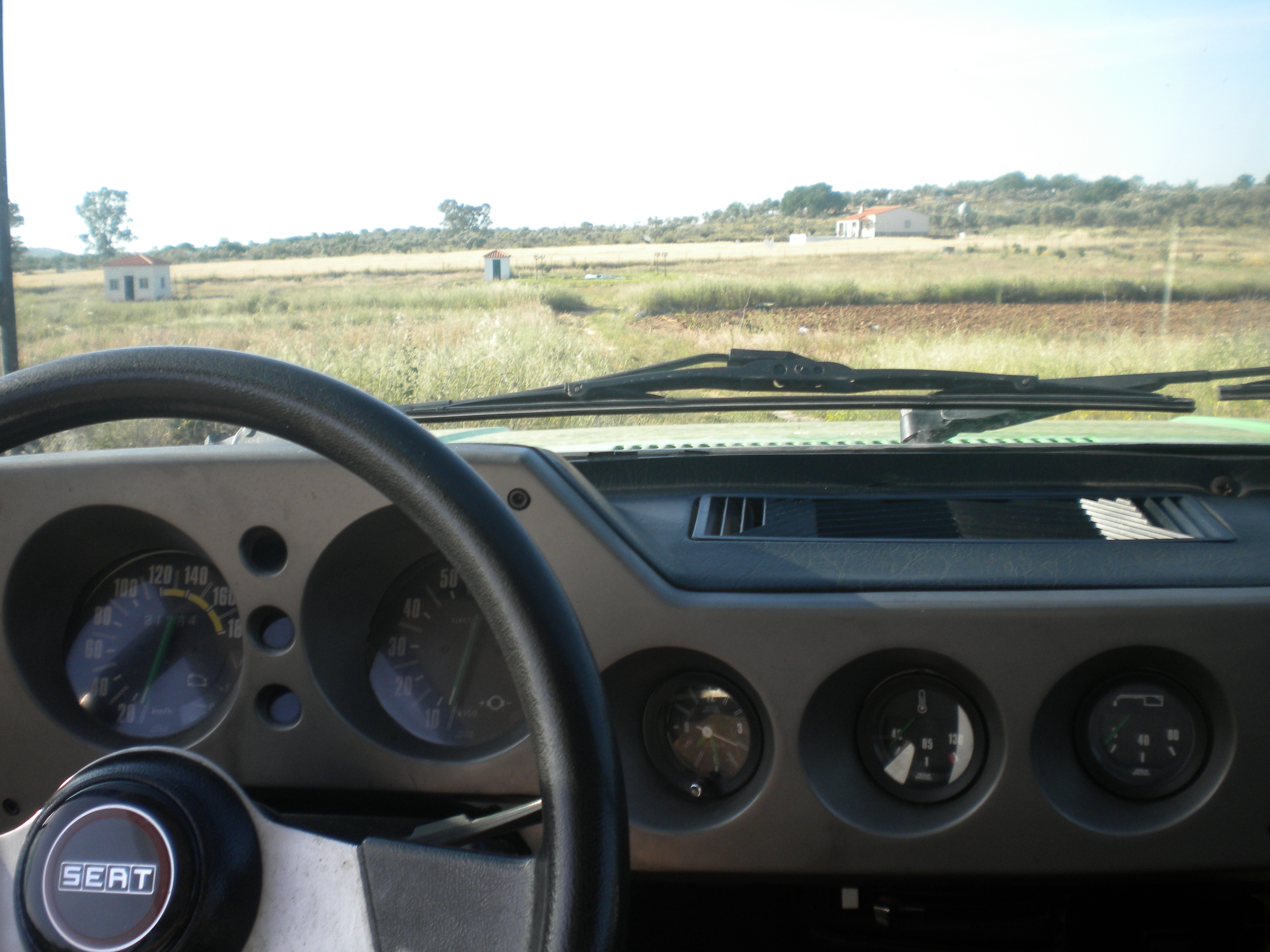
SEAT 1430 Sport (interior)

== Legacy ==
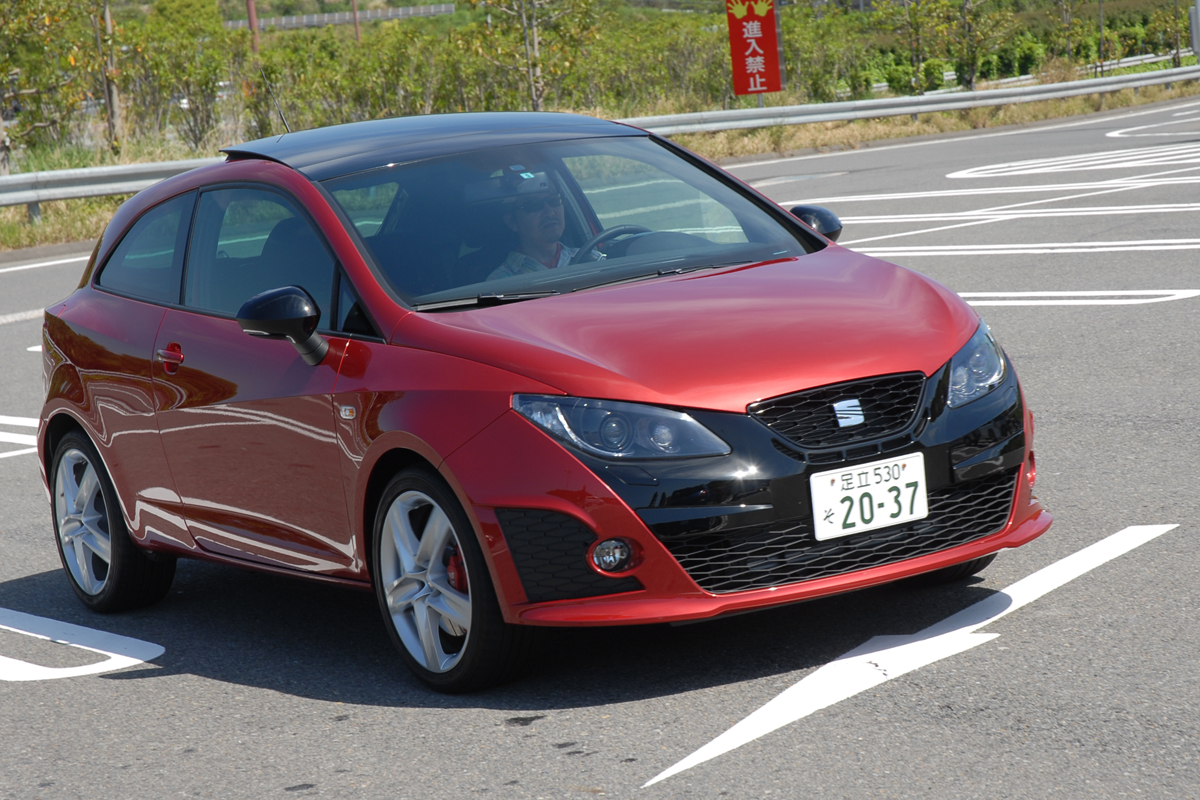
SEAT Ibiza Bocanegra

The car was widely known as the Boca negra ("black mouth" in Spanish) because of the color and shape of its black plastic front panel, which framed the front grille and the headlights and also formed the prominent front bumper. In 2008, SEAT presented the SEAT Bocanegra concept car at the Geneva Motor Show. It received this name as a homage to the classic 1200 Sport, as it also had a black front end. It is sold as a special-edition Ibiza model from the second half of 2009, based on the SEAT Ibiza FR and Cupra versions.

== Powertrain ==
Technical data SEAT 1200/1430 Sport (1979)
SEAT	1200 Sport	1430 Sport
Engine:	4-cylinder-inline engine (four-stroke), transversely front-mounted	
Displacement:	1,197 cc	1,438 cc
Bore x Stroke:	73 x 71.5 mm	80 x 71.5 mm
Max. Power @ rpm:	67 PS (49 kW) @ 5,600	77 PS (57 kW) @ 5,400
Max. Torque @ rpm:	90 N⋅m (66 lb⋅ft) @ 3,700	111 N⋅m (82 lb⋅ft) @ 3,400
Compression Ratio:	8.8:1	9.0:1
Fuel system:	1 downdraft carb. (2bbl)	
Valvetrain:	OHV, camshaft in block, toothed belt	
Cooling:	Water	
Gearbox:	4-speed-manual, front wheel drive	
Front suspension:	Struts, lower wishbone, coil springs, stabilizing bar	
Rear suspension::	Struts, lower wishbone, transverse leaf spring	
Brakes:	Front disc brakes (Ø 227 mm), rear drum brakes	
Steering:	Rack-and-pinion steering	
Body:	Steel, unibody construction	
Track front/rear:	1,310 mm (52 in) / 1,325 mm (52.2 in)	
Wheelbase:	2,225 mm (87.6 in)	
Length x Width x Height:	3,665 mm (144.3 in) x 1,555 mm (61.2 in) x 1,250 mm (49.2 in) mm	
Weight:	805 kg (1,775 lb)	815 kg (1,797 lb)
Top speed:	157 km/h (98 mph)	164 km/h (102 mph)
0–100 km/h (0−62 mph):	14.5 s	n.a.
Fuel consumption (DIN):	n.a.	7.0 litres per 100 kilometres (40 mpg_{‑imp}; 34 mpg_{‑US})

== Production figures ==
Since its launch in 1975 up to 1981, 19,332 SEAT 1200 and 1430 Sport cars have been sold and produced (11,619 units for the SEAT 1200 Sport and 7,713 for the SEAT 1430 Sport version).

The total production per year of SEAT 1200 Sport and SEAT 1430 Sport cars is shown in the following table :

Model	1975	1976	1977	1978	1979	1980	1981
SEAT 1200 Sport	391	7,322	2,478	1,271	156	1	
SEAT 1430 Sport			1,588	4,267	1,856	1	1
Total annual production	391	7,322	4,066	5,538	2,012	2	1
