= SEAT Bocanegra =

Motor vehicle

The SEAT Bocanegra is a three-door supermini automobile based on SEAT Ibiza Mk 4, built by the Spanish automaker SEAT and designed by former Lamborghini designer Luc Donckerwolke.

== SEAT Bocanegra concept car ==
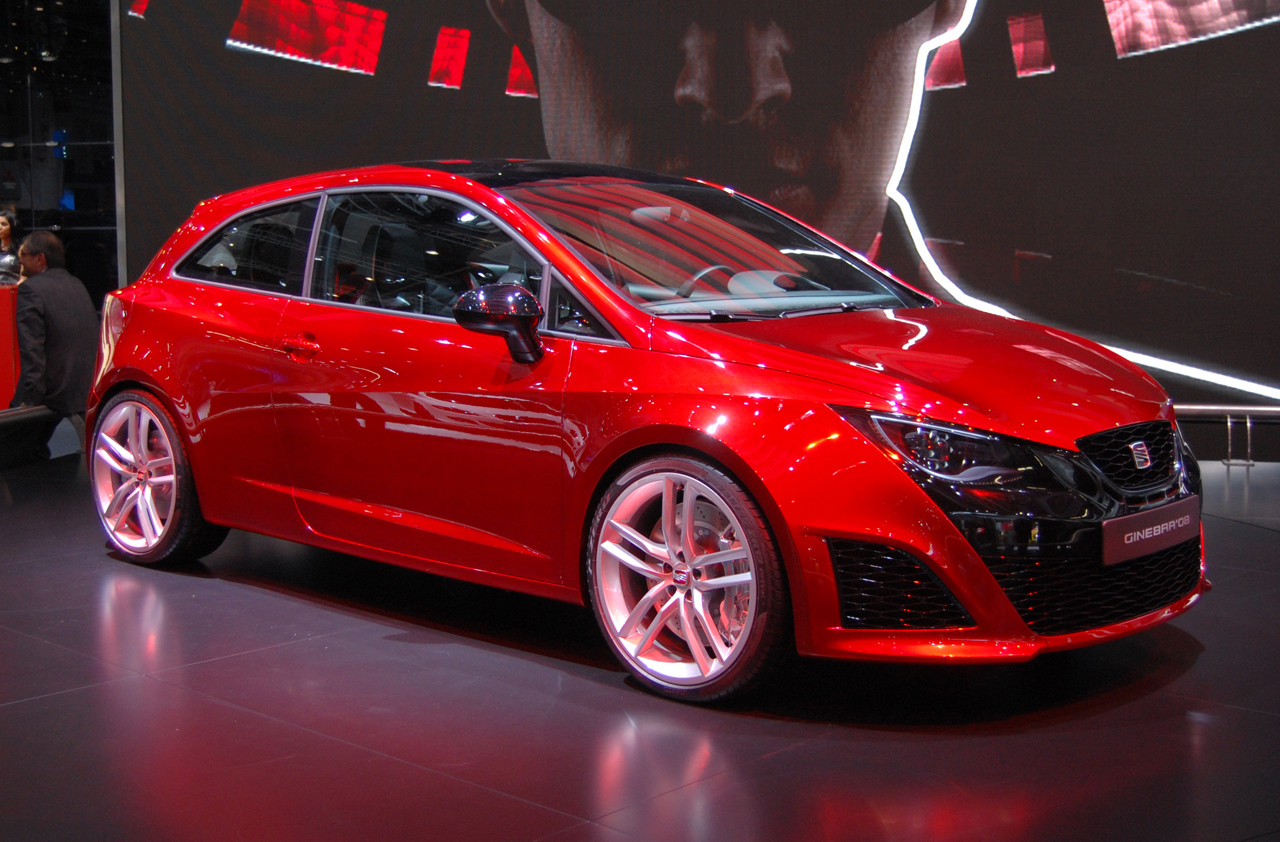
SEAT Bocanegra at the 2008 Geneva Motor Show

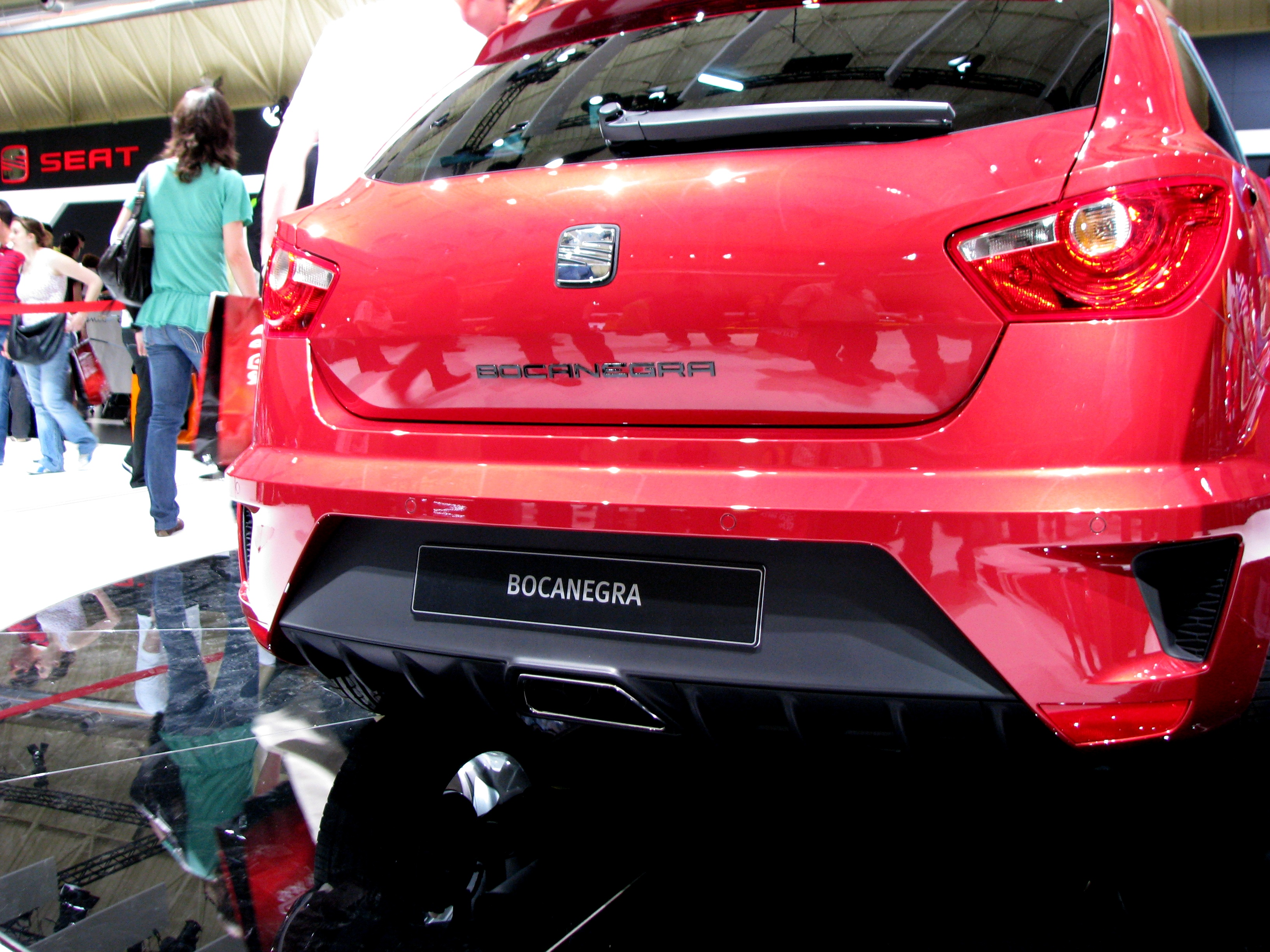
SEAT Bocanegra at the 2009 Barcelona Motor Show, rear view

The SEAT Bocanegra concept car was presented by SEAT by first time in 2008 and designed by former Lamborghini designer Luc Donckerwolke who at the moment had been assigned SEAT's design director.

It was presented at the 2008 Geneva Motor Show, sporting a more aggressive image as a showcase for the fifth-generation SEAT Ibiza, which was introduced in May 2008 at the Madrid Motor Show. The name Bocanegra - standing for "Black Mouth" in Spanish - derives from the whole front bumper made out of black-painted plastic with the headlights encased in clear perspex, tracing back to a previous SEAT model from the 1970s, the 1200 Sport which at the time had been nicknamed Bocanegra because of its black plastic front end.

It has a 1.4-liter TSI engine giving 180 PS (132 kW; 178 hp), and a newly presented seven-speed direct shift gearbox.

== SEAT Bocanegra production model ==
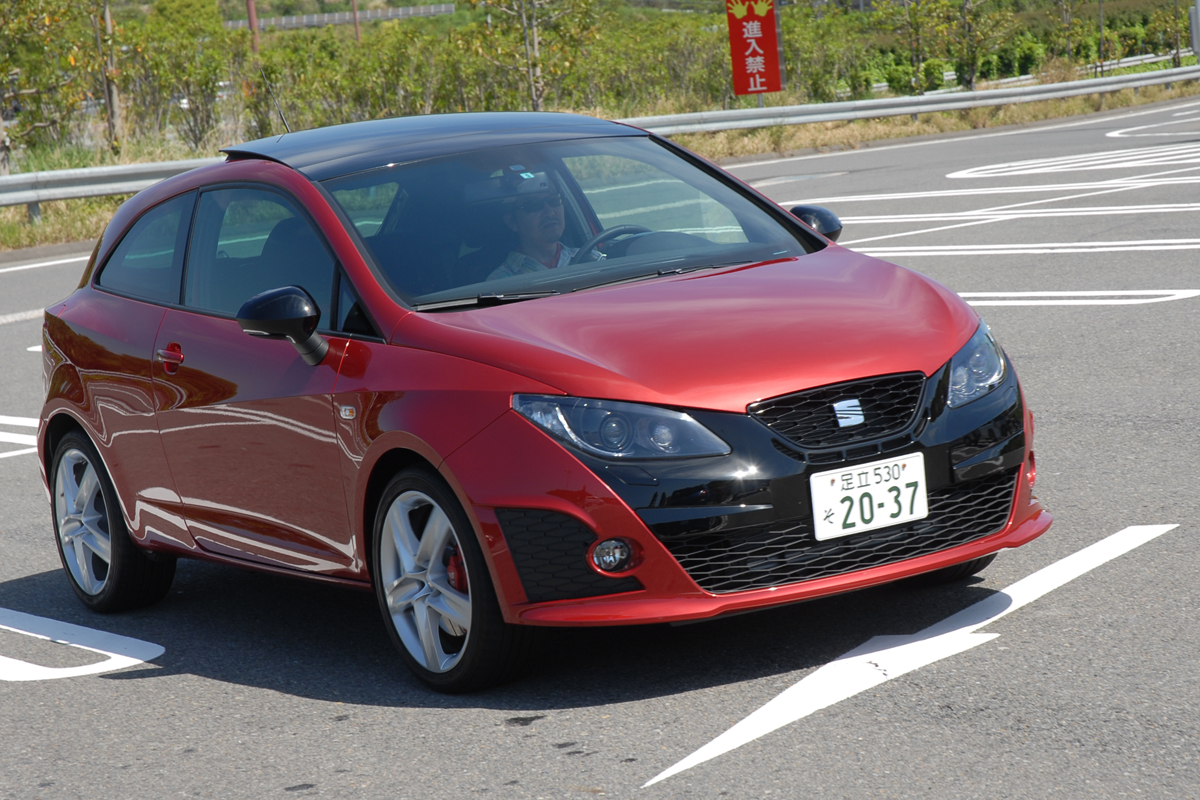
SEAT Ibiza Mk4 Bocanegra, front view

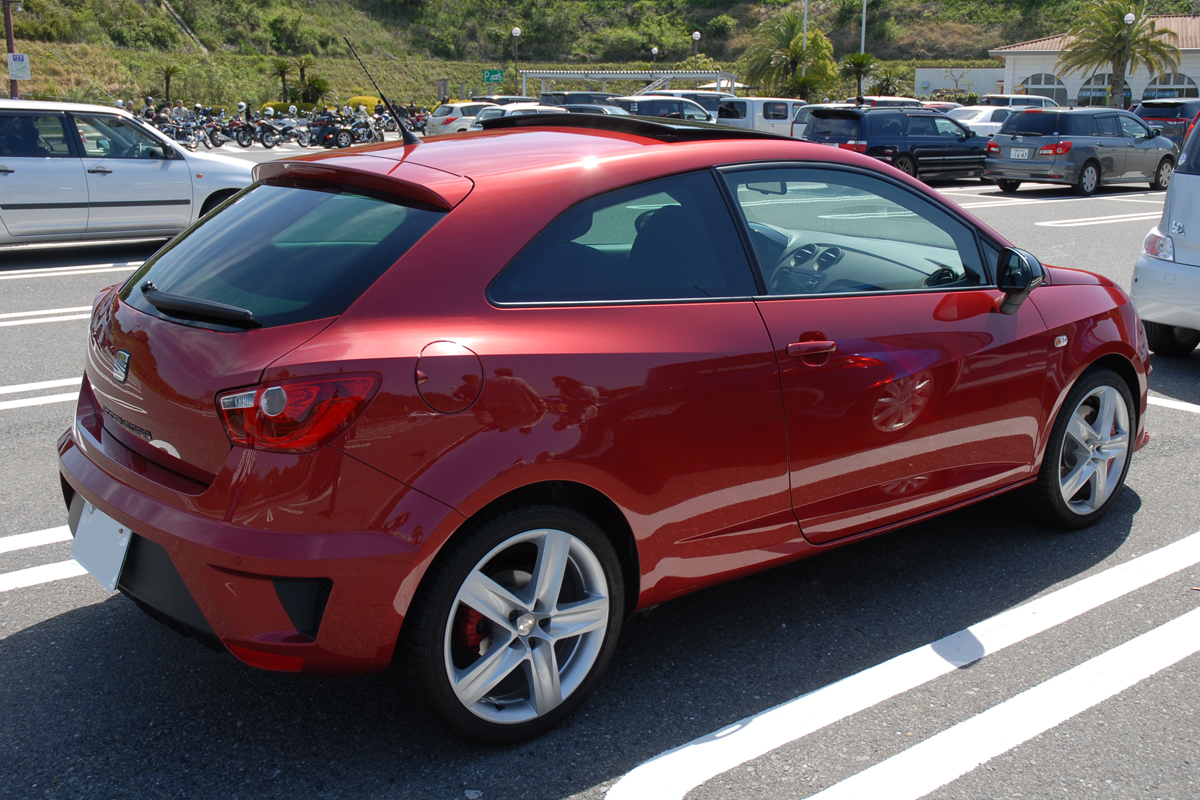
SEAT Ibiza Mk4 Bocanegra, rear view

The Bocanegra concept car's front end was carried to the fourth generation of the SEAT Ibiza as a special edition featuring the Bocanegra name, meant to be carried over in a limited series of 1,000 cars per year production. A Bocanegra version of the Ibiza ST estate was shown as a concept at Wörthersee 2010.
