= SEAT Fura =

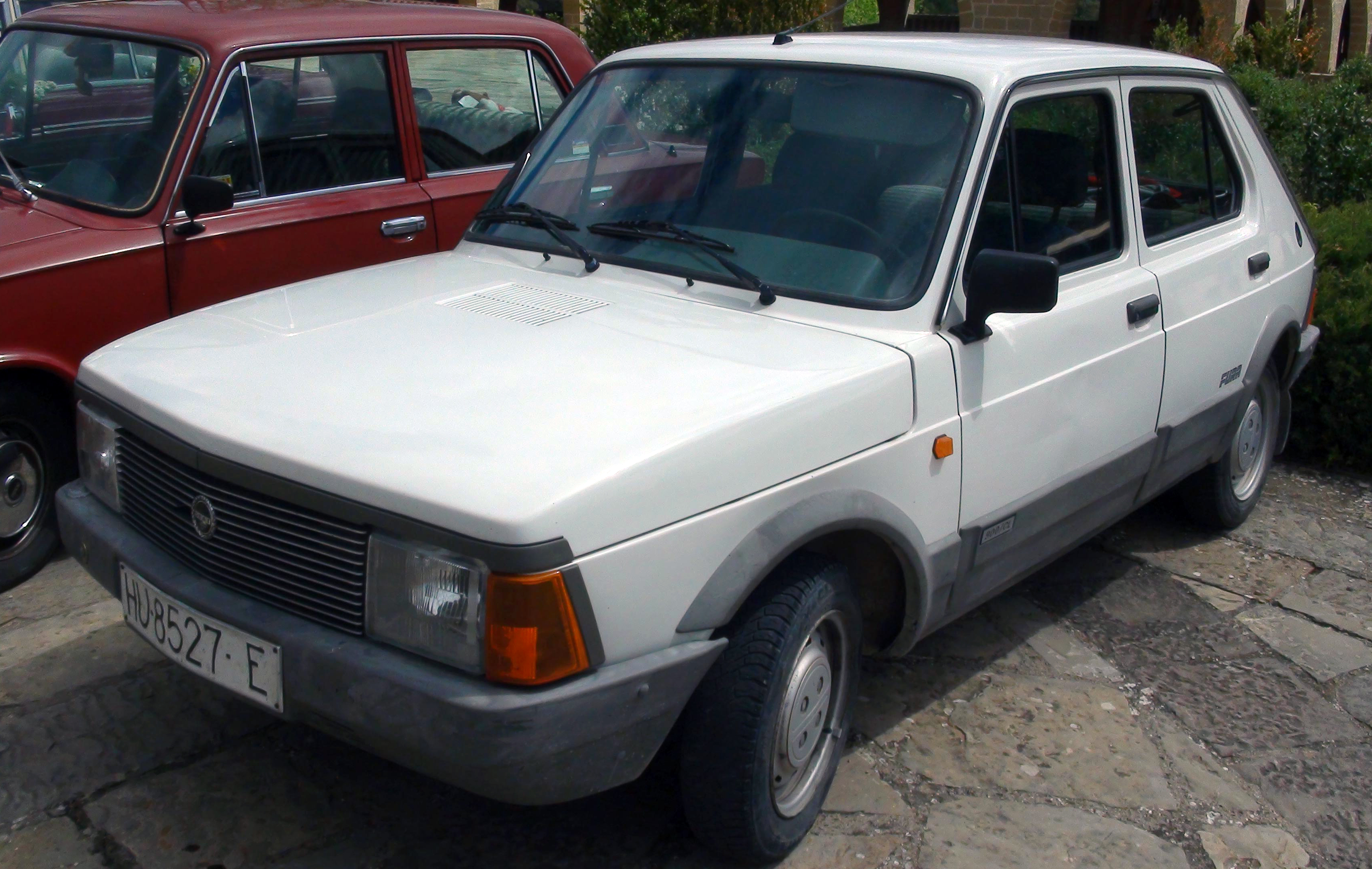
- 1981 SEAT Fura

Overview
- Manufacturer: SEAT
- Also called: Nasr Super Fura (Egypt)
- Production: 1981–1986; 84,973 (produced)
- Assembly: Spain: Barcelona (Zona Franca); Egypt: Cairo (Nasr)

Body and chassis
- Class: Supermini (B)
- Body style: 3/5-door hatchback
- Related: Fiat 127

Powertrain
- Engine: 903 cc OHV I4; 1,438 cc OHV I4
- Transmission: 5 speed (manual)

Chronology
- Predecessor: SEAT 127
- Successor: SEAT Ibiza

The SEAT Fura is a supermini car which was produced by Spanish car manufacturer SEAT between 1981 and 1986, and based on the Fiat 127, which had been built by the firm since April 1972.

== Overview ==
=== SEAT 127 Fura & SEAT Fura (1981–1982) ===
In November 1981, the last evolution of the SEAT 127 was presented as "SEAT 127 Fura". The 127 Fura was nearly identical to the Italian Fiat 127 series 3 (third series). Once the license to the 127 had expired, SEAT was forced to develop a new version which was introduced in end of 1981 for the model year of 1982. The model lost the "127" nomenclature, officially being renamed simply as "SEAT Fura". It was available in three and five door hatchback body styles. Sales commenced in January 1982.

The two and four door sedan versions of the Fiat 127 were discontinued. The Fura was never available with the larger 1,010 cc unit which was seen in the SEAT 127, but did receive the five-speed manual transmission as standard.

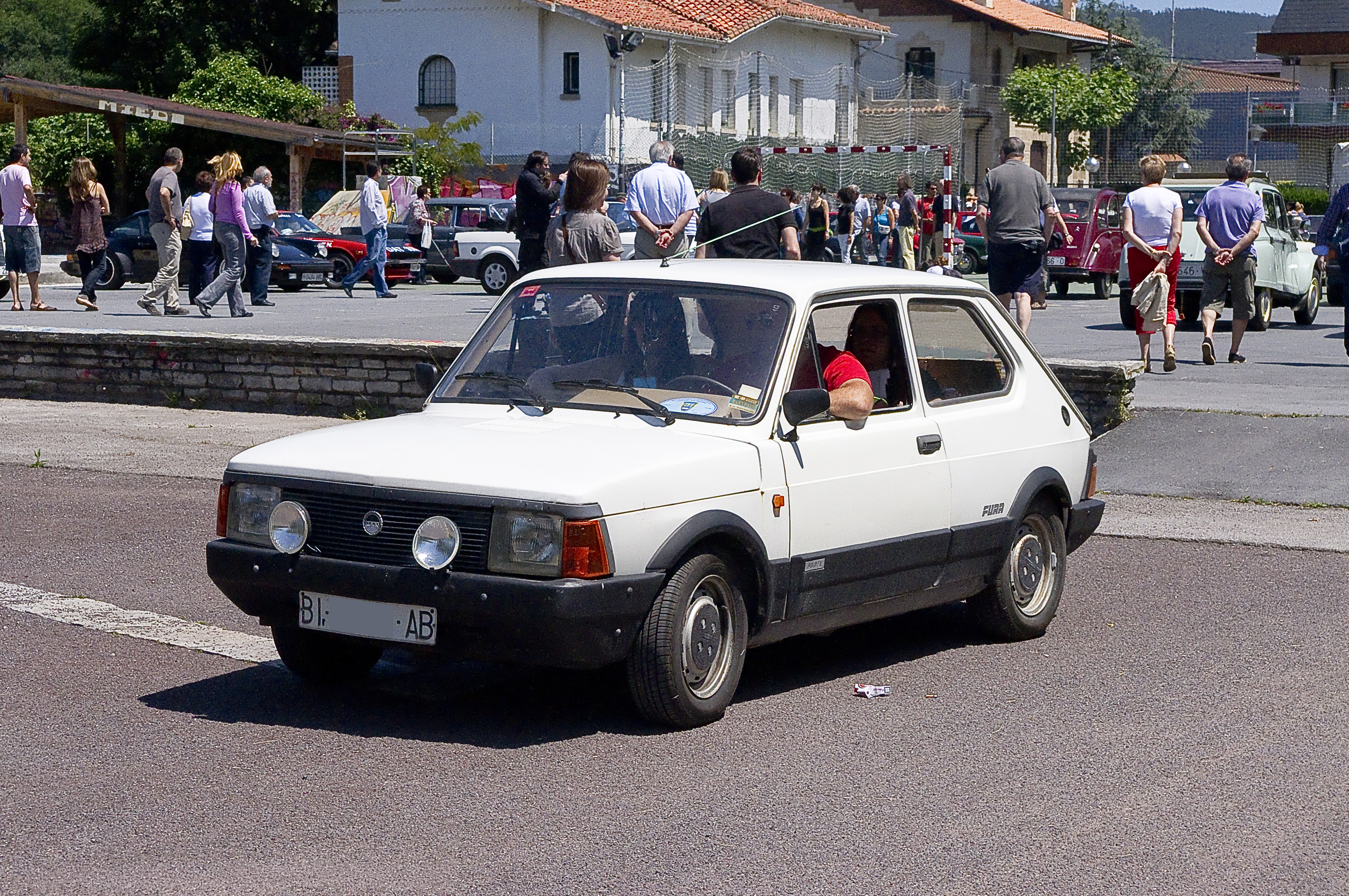
SEAT Fura 3-door (pre-facelift)

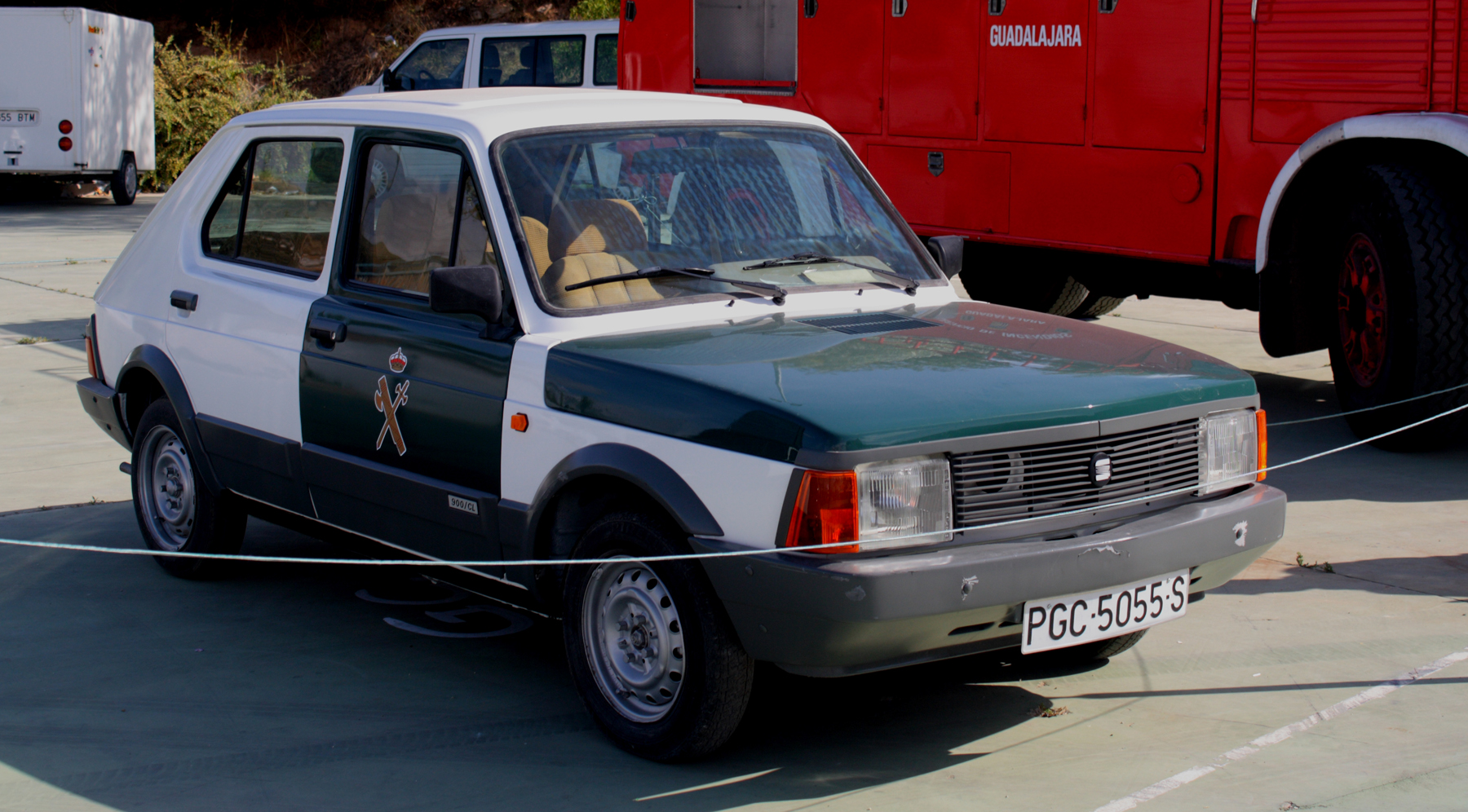
SEAT Fura 5-door (pre-facelift)

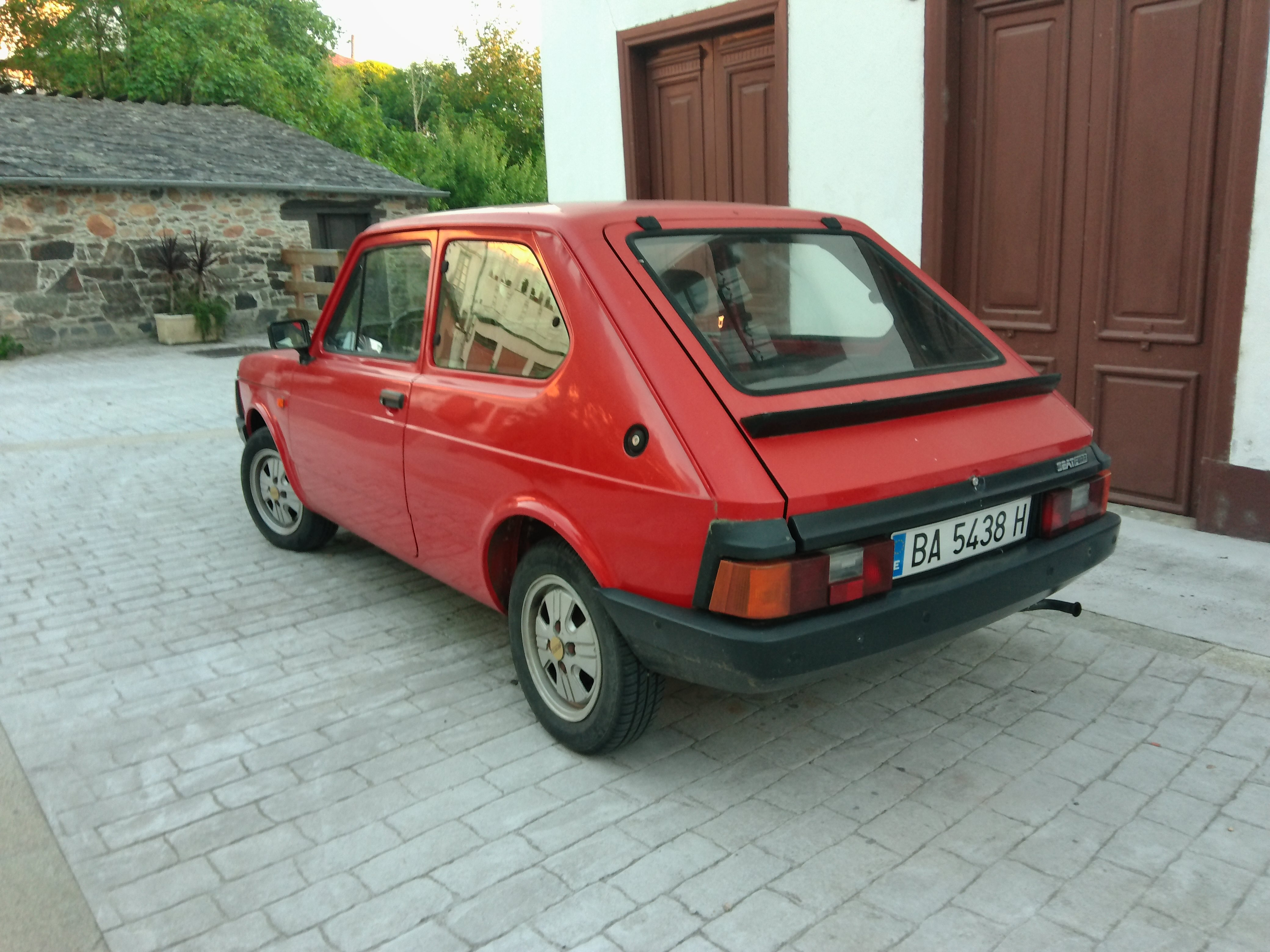
SEAT Fura 3-door (rear view)

=== Seat Fura Dos (1983–1986) ===
After the facelift of 1983, the SEAT Fura Dos (two) was introduced: it did not differ much from its predecessor, mainly through smaller headlights and turn signals. The launch of the first generation SEAT Ibiza in April 1984 made the car largely redundant, although it continued to be offered as a lower-cost alternative to the new model.

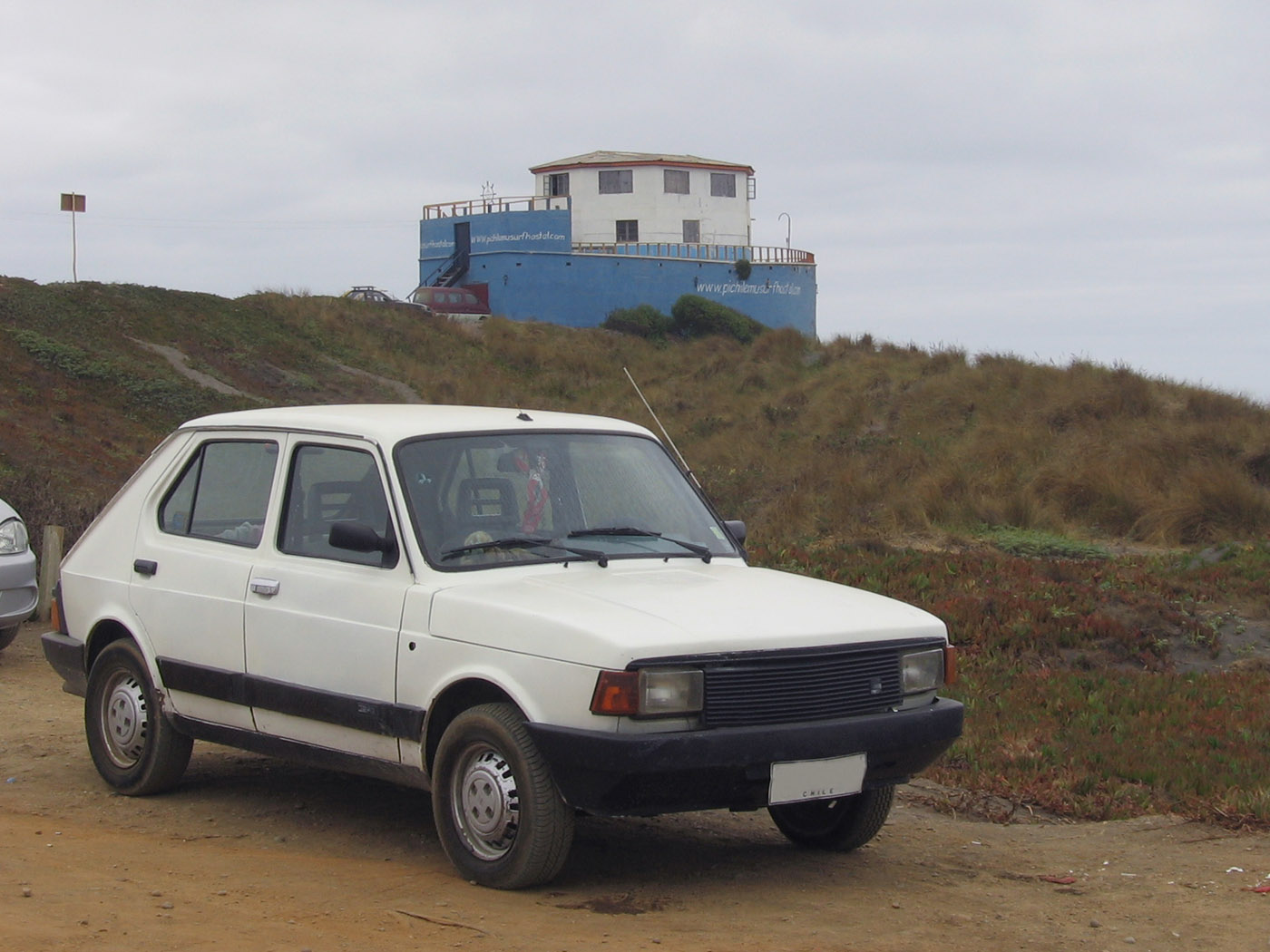
SEAT Fura Dos 5-door (facelift)

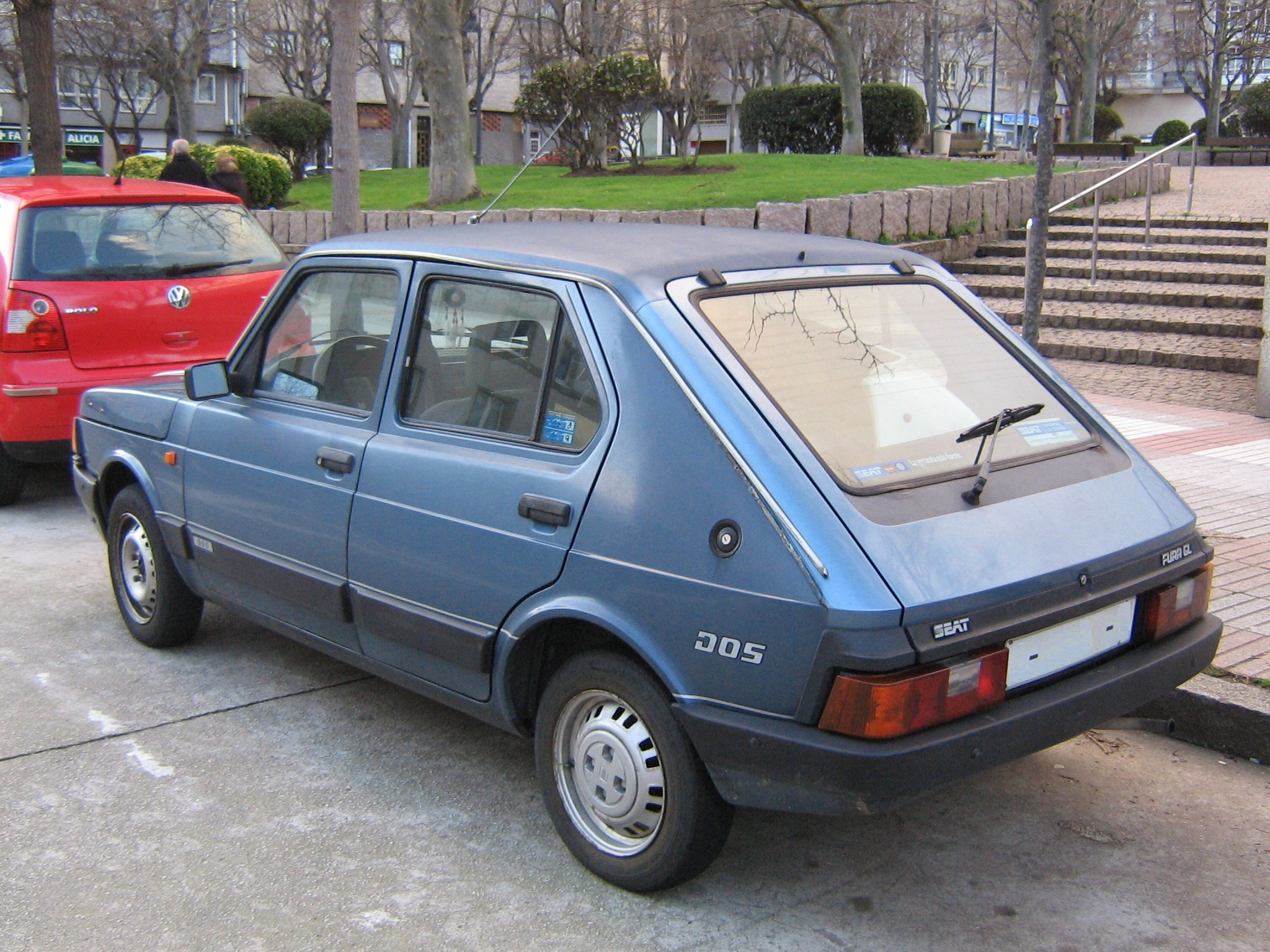
SEAT Fura Dos 5-door (rear view)

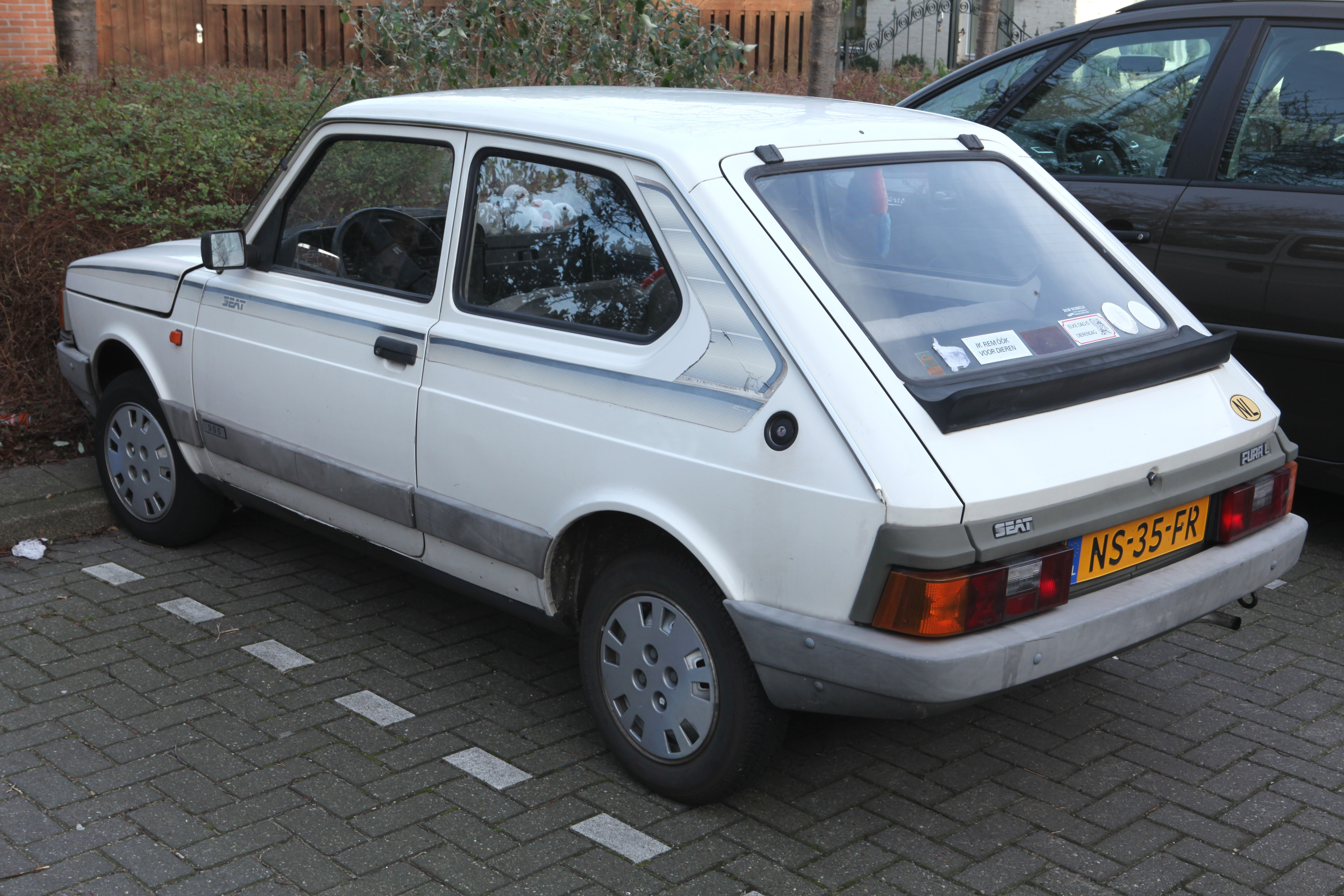
SEAT Fura Dos 3-door (rear view)

For slightly more than one year, these two compact hatches competed internally, but the somewhat outmoded Fura was officially discontinued in December 1986. Some design parts of this model were also used in the Ibiza Mk1.

==== SEAT Fura Crono ====
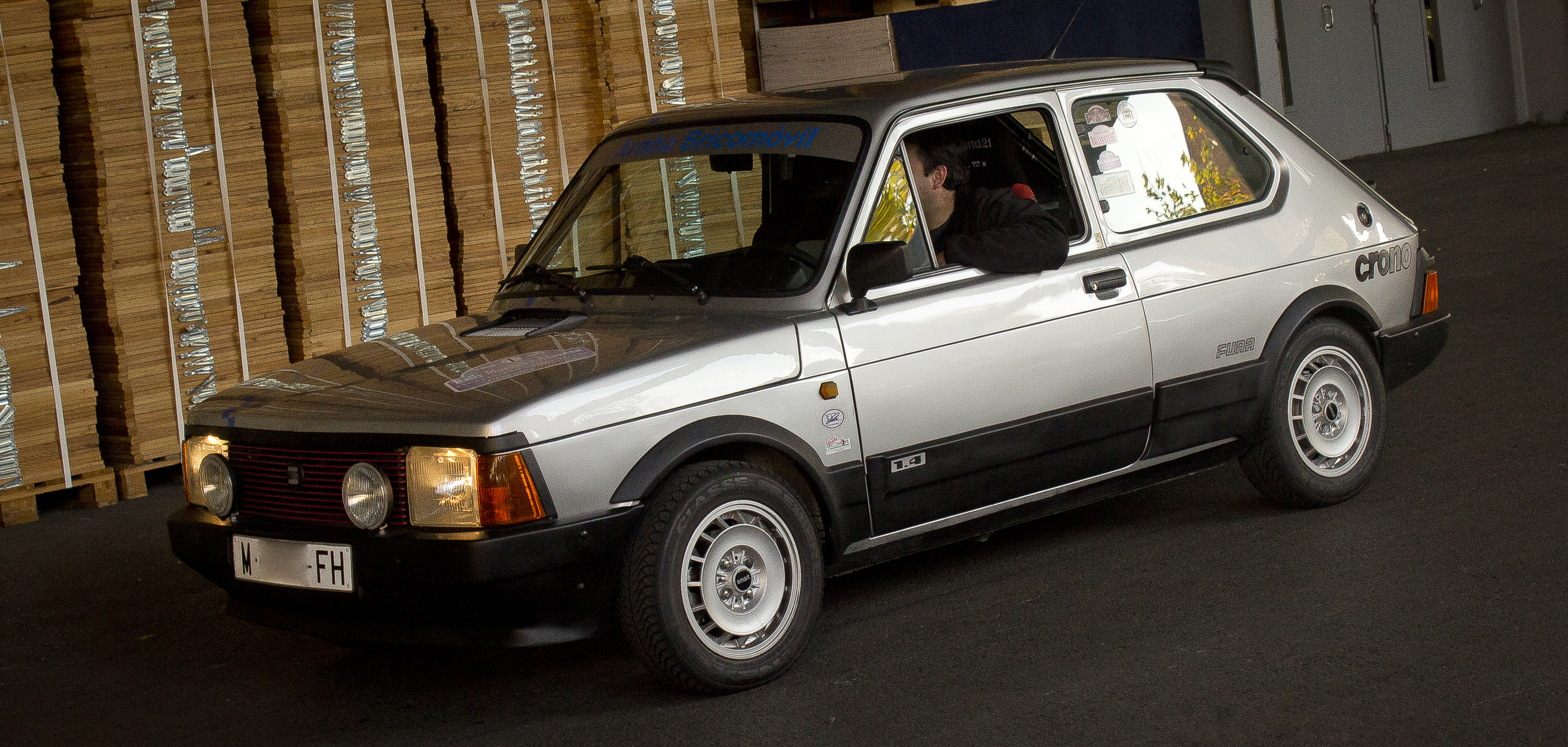
1983 SEAT Fura Crono

A hot hatch called the Fura Crono was introduced in the beginning of in 1983. Fitted with spoilers front and rear, as well as twin fog lights up front and unique 13" alloy wheels, it was powered by the 75 PS (55 kW) 1,438 cc four cylinder. The twin carb engine, the same as used in the SEAT 124, provided the top speed of 160 km/h (99 mph), and the 100 km/h sprint was managed in 10.8 seconds.

== Motorsport ==
The SEAT Fura Crono was used in the Copa Fura one make rally series, which was launched in 1983 and terminated in 1985. The cars were tuned by Abarth and produced 90 PS (66 kW).

== Licensed production ==
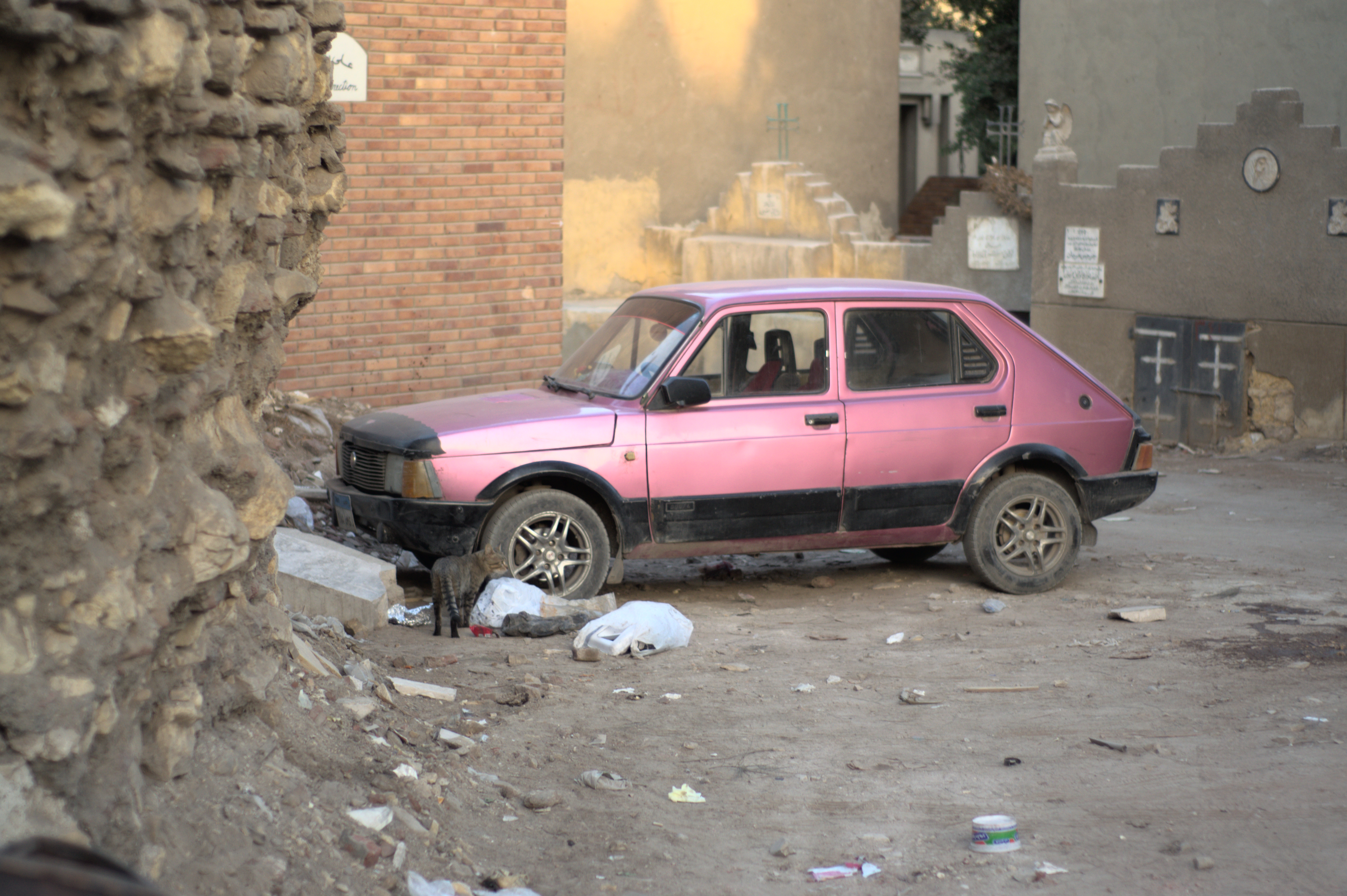
Nasr Super Fura (Egypt)

The car was also assembled by NASR in Cairo as the El Nasr Super Fura.
