= Alfa Romeo Cuorerosso =

- Cuorerosso in 2026

Overview
- Manufacturer: Alfa Romeo
- Designer: Alfa Romeo Centro Stile, led by Alejandro Mesonero-Romanos

Body and chassis
- Class: Concept car
- Body style: 4-door coupé (2+2)
- Layout: Front-engine, all-wheel drive (Q4)

Powertrain
- Engine: 2.9 L twin-turbocharged V6 (petrol hybrid concept)
- Transmission: Torque-converter automatic

Dimensions
- Wheelbase: 2,930 millimetres (115.4 in)
- Length: 4,700 millimetres (185.0 in)
- Width: 1,980 millimetres (78.0 in)
- Height: 1,331 millimetres (52.4 in)
- Kerb weight: 1,750 kilograms (3,858 lb)

The Alfa Romeo Cuorerosso (Italian: Cuorerosso, lit. 'red heart') is a four-door, 2+2 concept car developed by Alfa Romeo and unveiled in 2026. It was presented at a preview event ahead of the Paris Motor Show in October 2026 and subsequently displayed at the show. The concept explores the design and electrification of future Alfa Romeo models.

== Background ==
The Cuorerosso name was announced on 29 September 2026. It combines the Italian words cuore, meaning heart, and rosso, meaning red. The car was conceived as a design and technology study rather than a preview of a confirmed production model.

The design was developed by Alfa Romeo's Centro Stile team, led by Alejandro Mesonero-Romanos. It follows the company's Bellezza Necessaria, or necessary beauty, design approach. Early studies used a continuous form without wheels, glazing or other details to concentrate on the car's proportions.

== Design ==
Rear view

The Cuorerosso has a wedge-shaped body, a low nose and a truncated coda tronca tail. Its front retains Alfa Romeo's shield-shaped Scudetto grille, with a backlit representation of the marque's emblem. The rear doors are rear-hinged and operated through touch controls on the roof. The glazing sits flush with the body, and the forged wheels have six circular elements arranged on three spokes.

The Liquid Ink Red paint combines an aluminium base with a tinted transparent layer, producing a change from red to black depending on lighting and viewing angle.

The predominantly red cabin has a 2+2 seating layout. A centre-console interface called the Magma Display combines touch controls with physical controls. Two circular instrument displays ahead of the driver can merge into a single display area.

== Powertrain and chassis ==
The proposed hybrid powertrain combines a 2.9-litre twin-turbocharged V6 petrol engine with electric propulsion. It is paired with a torque-converter automatic transmission, Q4 all-wheel drive and a carbon-fibre driveshaft. The chassis design includes air suspension, Brembo carbon-ceramic brakes and steer-by-wire steering.

The car measures 4,700 millimetres (185.0 in) long, 1,980 millimetres (78.0 in) wide and 1,331 millimetres (52.4 in) high, with a 2,930 millimetres (115.4 in) wheelbase and a stated mass of 1,750 kilograms (3,858 lb). Its stated drag coefficient is 0.28, with a truncated tail and a low diffuser integrated into the bodywork.
