= SEAT Minimó =

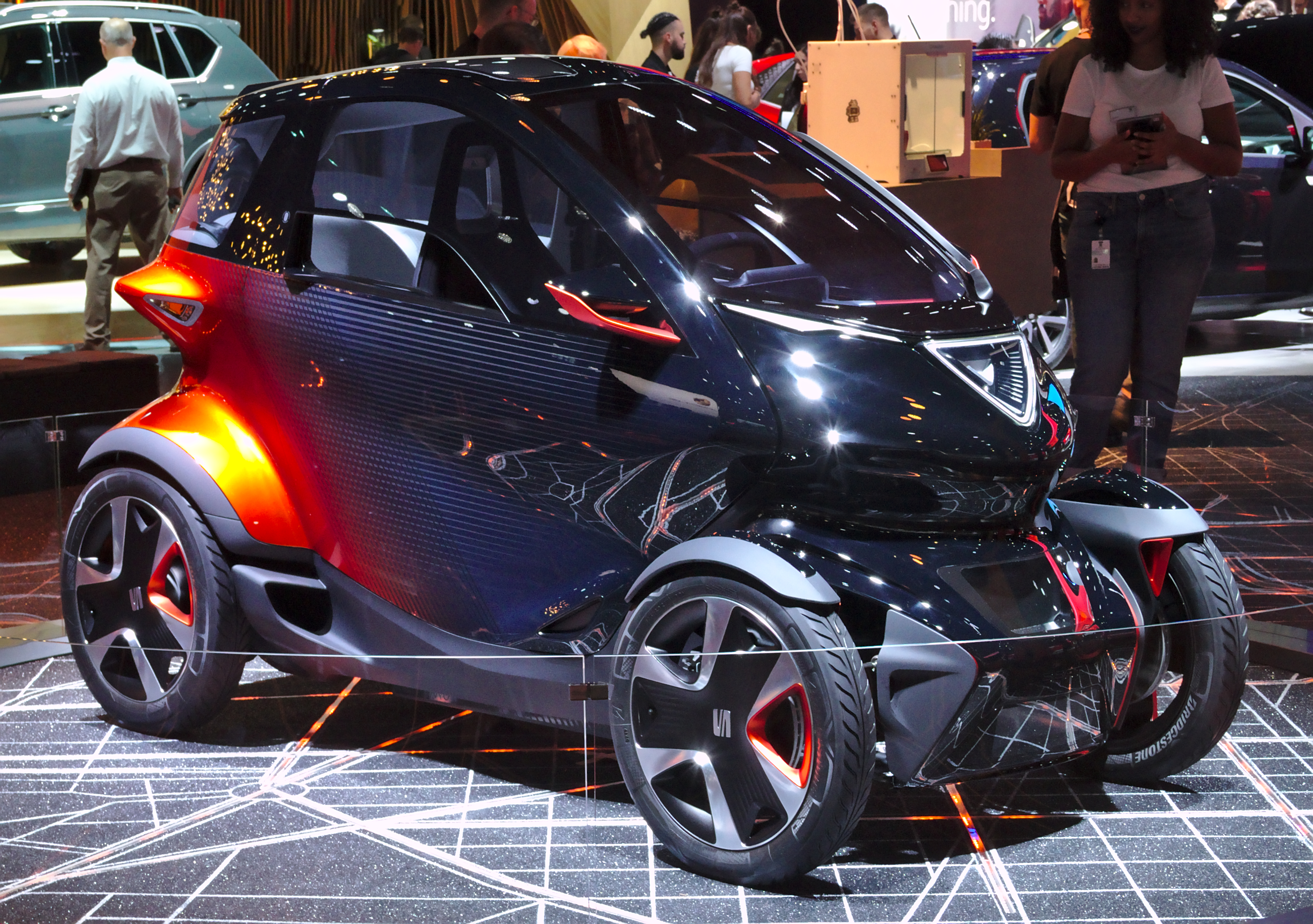

Overview
- Manufacturer: SEAT
- Production: 2019 (Concept car); TBA (to commence)
- Designer: Alejandro Mesonero-Romanos

Body and chassis
- Class: City car Quadricycle

Powertrain
- Battery: 15kWh

Dimensions
- Length: 2,500 mm (98.4 in)
- Width: 1,240 mm (48.8 in)

The SEAT Minimó is a concept electric quadricycle which was developed by the Spanish car manufacturer SEAT. It was first announced at the 2019 Mobile World Congress in Barcelona and was first revealed at the Geneva International Motor Show that year, alongside the Volkswagen ID.3-based Cupra Born and Cupra Formentor concept vehicles.

A production version of the Minimó was scheduled for sale by 2021, which did not occur for unknown reasons.

== Specifications ==
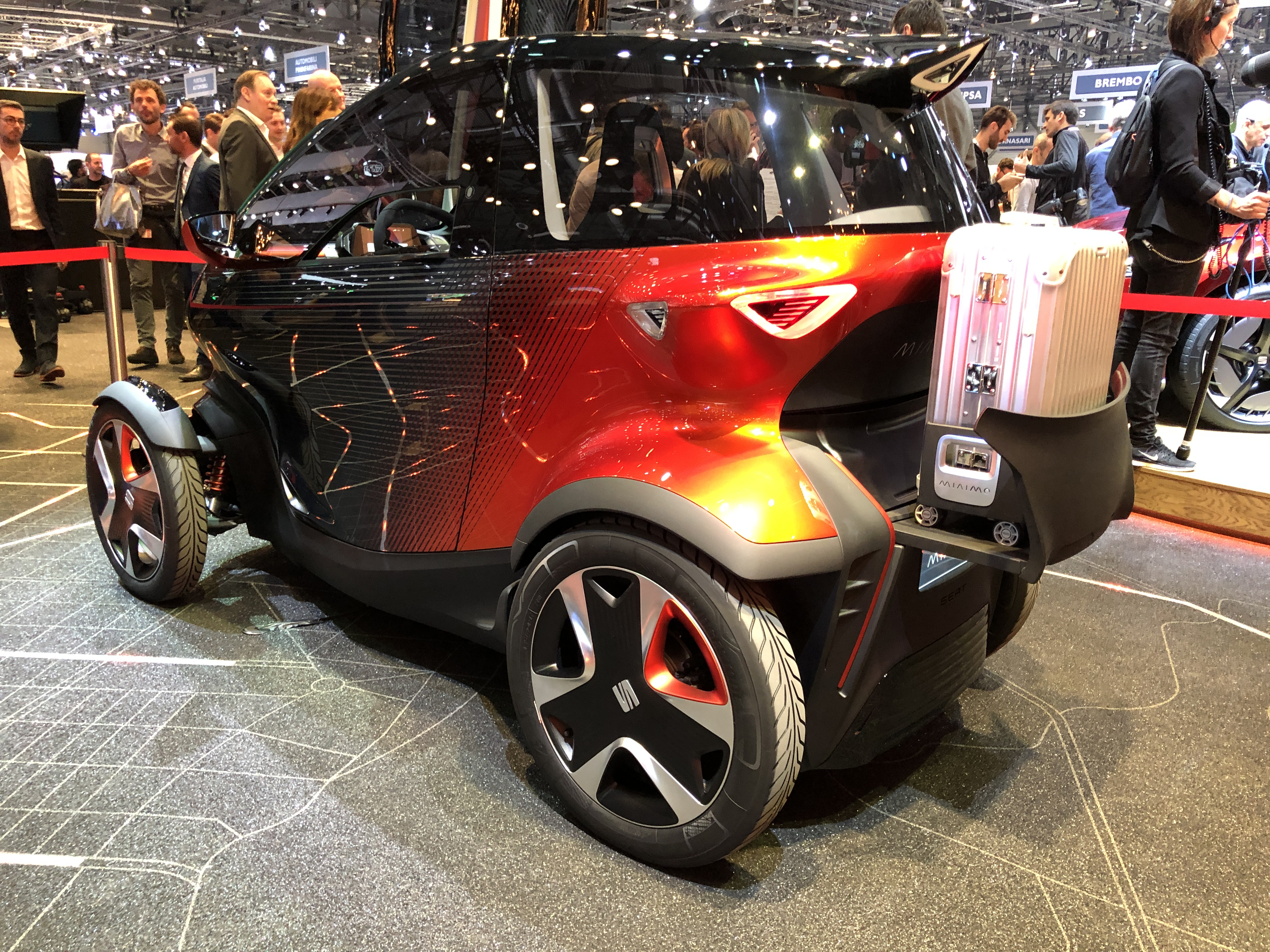
SEAT Minimó (back/left)

The Minimó is an all-electric quadricycle measuring 2,500 mm (98.4 in) long and 1,240 mm (48.8 in) wide and has a similar layout to the Renault Twizy, with two seats laid one behind the other.

The Minimó has a 15 kWh battery with a claimed range of 100 km. The battery pack is designed to be removed and swapped out for a charged unit. The prototype is fitted with Android Auto and Level Four autonomous capability together with 5G connectivity.
