= SEAT Arona =

Subcompact crossover SUV

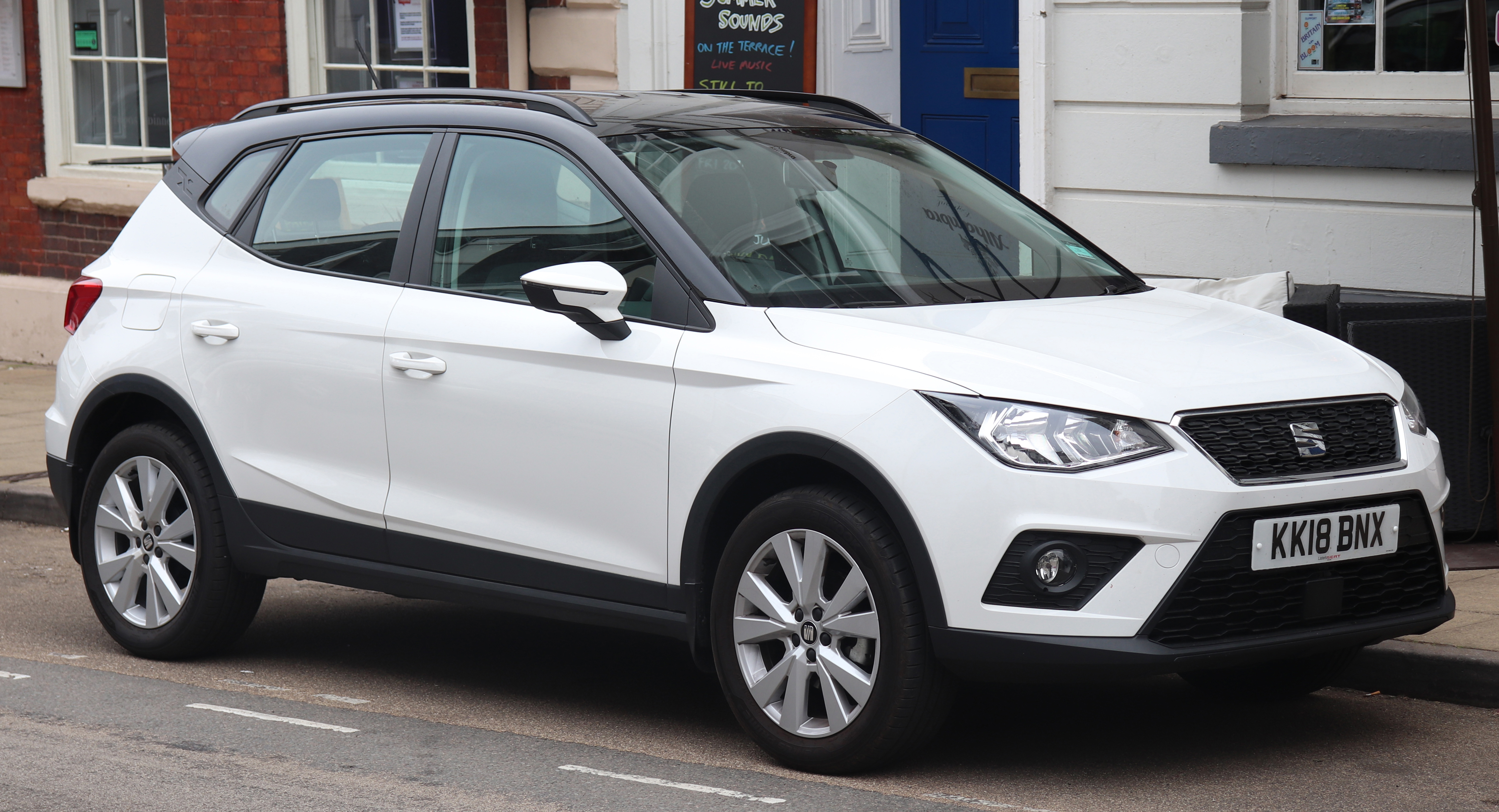

Overview
- Manufacturer: SEAT
- Model code: KJ7
- Production: 2017–present
- Assembly: Spain: Martorell, Catalonia
- Designer: Julio Lozano under Alejandro Mesonero-Romanos

Body and chassis
- Class: Subcompact crossover SUV (B)
- Body style: 5-door SUV
- Layout: Front-engine, front-wheel-drive
- Platform: Volkswagen Group MQB A0
- Related: SEAT Ibiza Mk5; Volkswagen T-Cross; Volkswagen Polo Mk6; Škoda Kamiq

Powertrain
- Engine: Petrol: 1.0 L 95 TSI I3; 1.0 L 115 TSI I3; 1.5 L 150 TSI Evo I4; Diesel: 1.6 L 95 TDI I4; 1.6 L 115 TDI I4; Petrol/CNG: 1.0 L 90 TGI I3
- Transmission: 5-speed manual 6-speed manual 7-speed DSG

Dimensions
- Wheelbase: 2,566 mm (101.0 in)
- Length: 4,138 mm (162.9 in)
- Width: 1,780 mm (70.1 in)
- Height: 1,552 mm (61.1 in)

The SEAT Arona is a subcompact crossover SUV (B-segment) manufactured by SEAT since 2017, as the smallest crossover SUV offered by the Spanish brand. As of 2019, it slots in below the Ateca compact model and Tarraco seven-seater.

== Overview ==
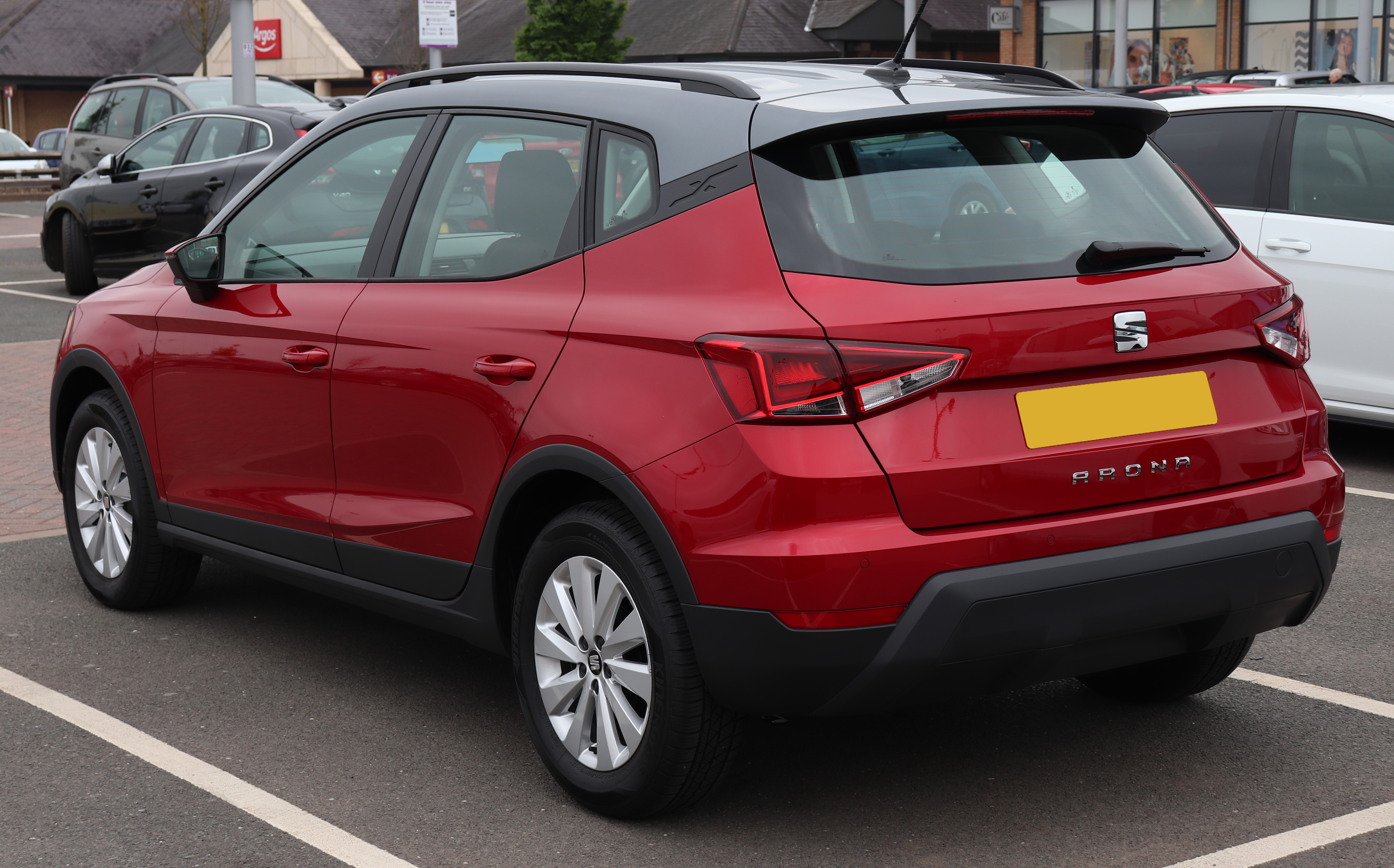
Rear view

SEAT launched three new sport utility vehicles between 2016 and 2019, due to the growing popularity of them. First was the middle one in size, the Ateca in 2016, next is the Arona, and the mid-size SUV is the Tarraco in 2018.

Before its reveal, SEAT's deputy chairman Ramón Paredes met with mayor of Arona, Tenerife, Spain. The Ibiza-based crossover was first presented in Barcelona on 26 June 2017. The car was shown to the public audience in the Frankfurt Motor Show for the first time in September 2017.

The Arona is based on the same platform as the current Ibiza, while the said platform also underpin various vehicles in manufactured by Volkswagen Group including the Volkswagen Polo, Volkswagen T-Cross, and Škoda Kamiq.

The facelift for the Arona was revealed on 15 April 2021. Changes include updated exterior styling with all exterior lighting uses LED, the interior received a free-standing touchscreen infotainment system and new advanced driving safety features.

== Powertrain ==
The Arona is available with three engines: the petrol engines consists of a 1.0-litre 3-cylinder unit with 95 PS (94 hp; 70 kW) or 115 PS (113 hp; 85 kW) turbocharged engine or a 1.5-litre TSI Evo 4-cylinder with 150 PS (148 hp; 110 kW) with cylinder deactivation. There are two diesel engine both 1.6-litre TDI with either 95 PS (94 hp; 70 kW) or 115 PS (113 hp; 85kW).

In September 2018, a CNG version was introduced with a 1.0-litre TGI engine.

Model	Displacement	Power	Torque	Transmission
Petrol engines
1.0 TSI 95	999 cc I3	95 PS (70 kW; 94 hp)	175 N⋅m (129 lb⋅ft)	5-speed manual
1.0 TSI 115	999 cc I3	115 PS (85 kW; 113 hp)	200 N⋅m (148 lb⋅ft)	6-speed manual or 7-speed DSG
1.5 TSI 150 Evo	1,498 cc I4	150 PS (110 kW; 148 hp)	250 N⋅m (184 lb⋅ft)	6-speed manual or 7-speed DSG
Diesel engine
1.6 TDI 95	1,598 cc I4	95 PS (70 kW; 94 hp)	250 N⋅m (184 lb⋅ft)	5-speed manual or 7-speed DSG
1.6 TDI 115	1,598 cc I4	115 PS (85kW; 113 hp)	250 N⋅m (184 lb⋅ft)	6-speed manual
Petrol/CNG engine
1.0 TGI 90	999 cc I3	90 PS (66 kW; 89 hp)	160 N⋅m (118 lb⋅ft)	6-speed manual

== Safety ==
=== Euro NCAP ===
Euro NCAP test results SEAT Arona 1.0 TSI Excellence (LHD) (2017)
Test	Points	%
Overall:	5 /5 stars	
Adult occupant:	36.2	95%
Child occupant:	39.4	80%
Pedestrian:	32.4	77%
Safety assist:	7.3	60%

=== Latin NCAP ===
The updated Spanish-built Arona in its most basic Latin American version received 5 stars for adult occupants and 5 for child occupants from Latin NCAP 2.0 in 2018.

Latin NCAP 2.0 test results Seat Arona + 6 Airbags (from 01/09/2018) (2018, based on Euro NCAP 2008)
Test	Points	Stars
Adult occupant:	29.95/34.0	5 /5 stars
Child occupant:	42.54/49.00	5 /5 stars

== Gallery ==
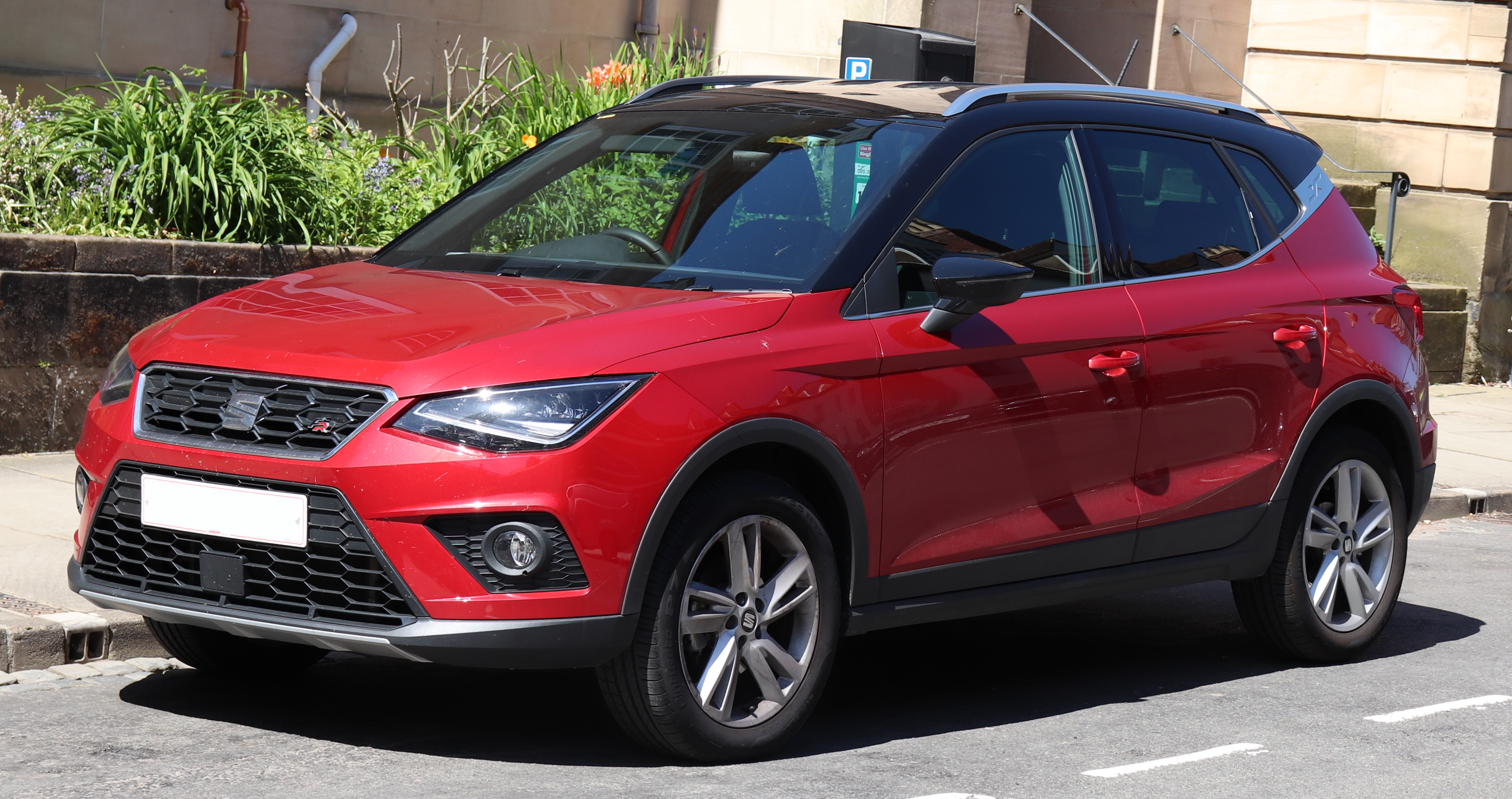
SEAT Arona FR

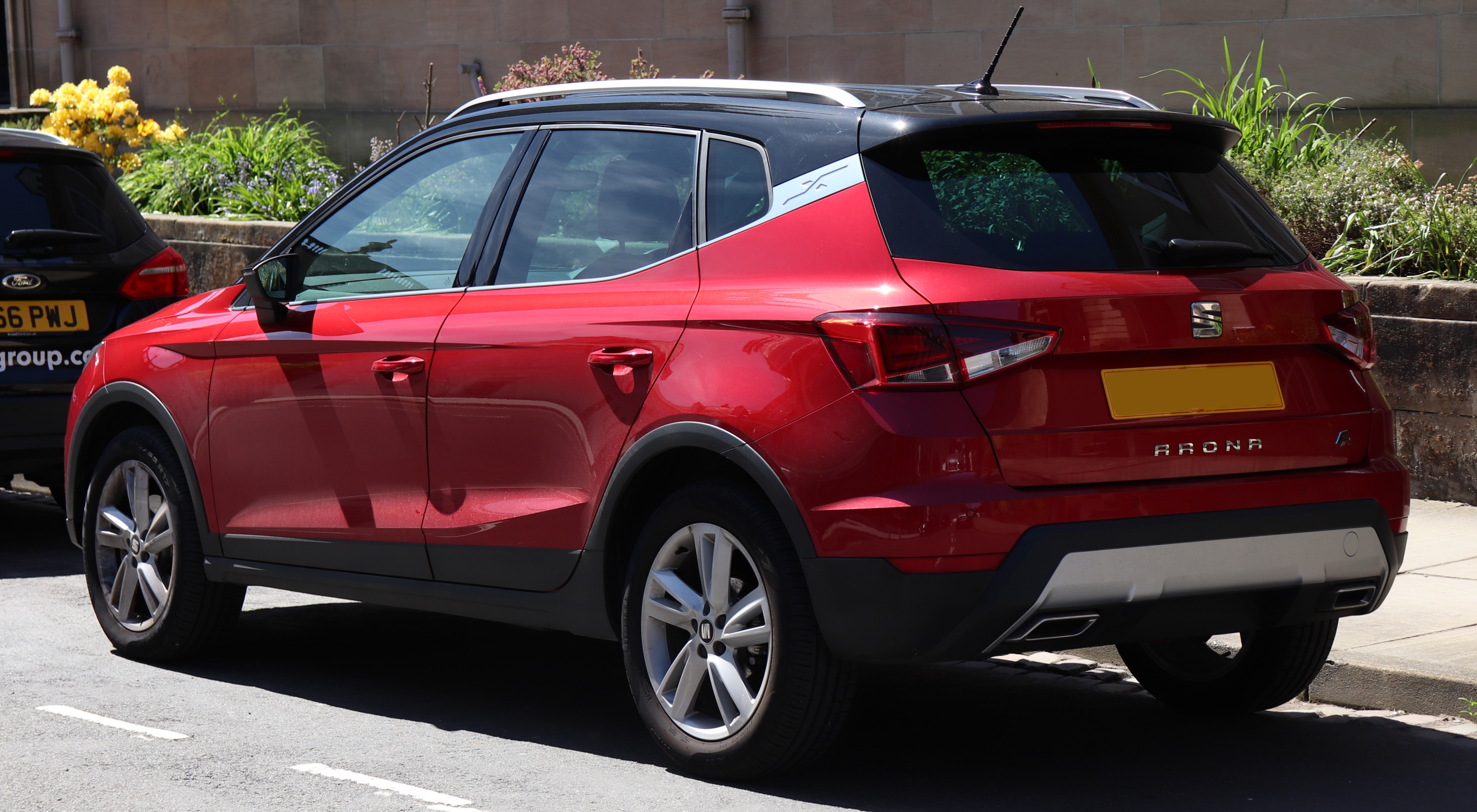
SEAT Arona FR

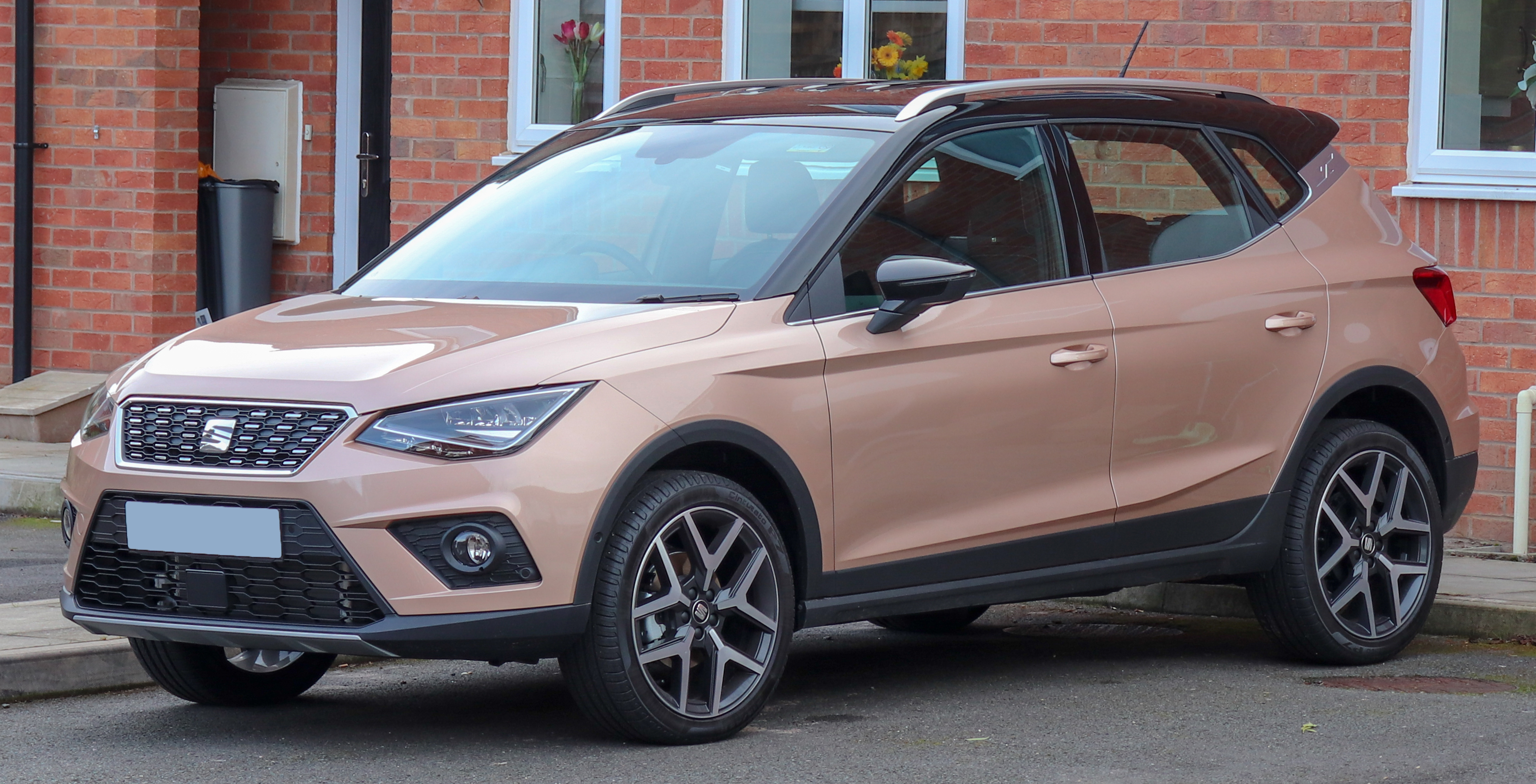
SEAT Arona XCELLENCE Lux

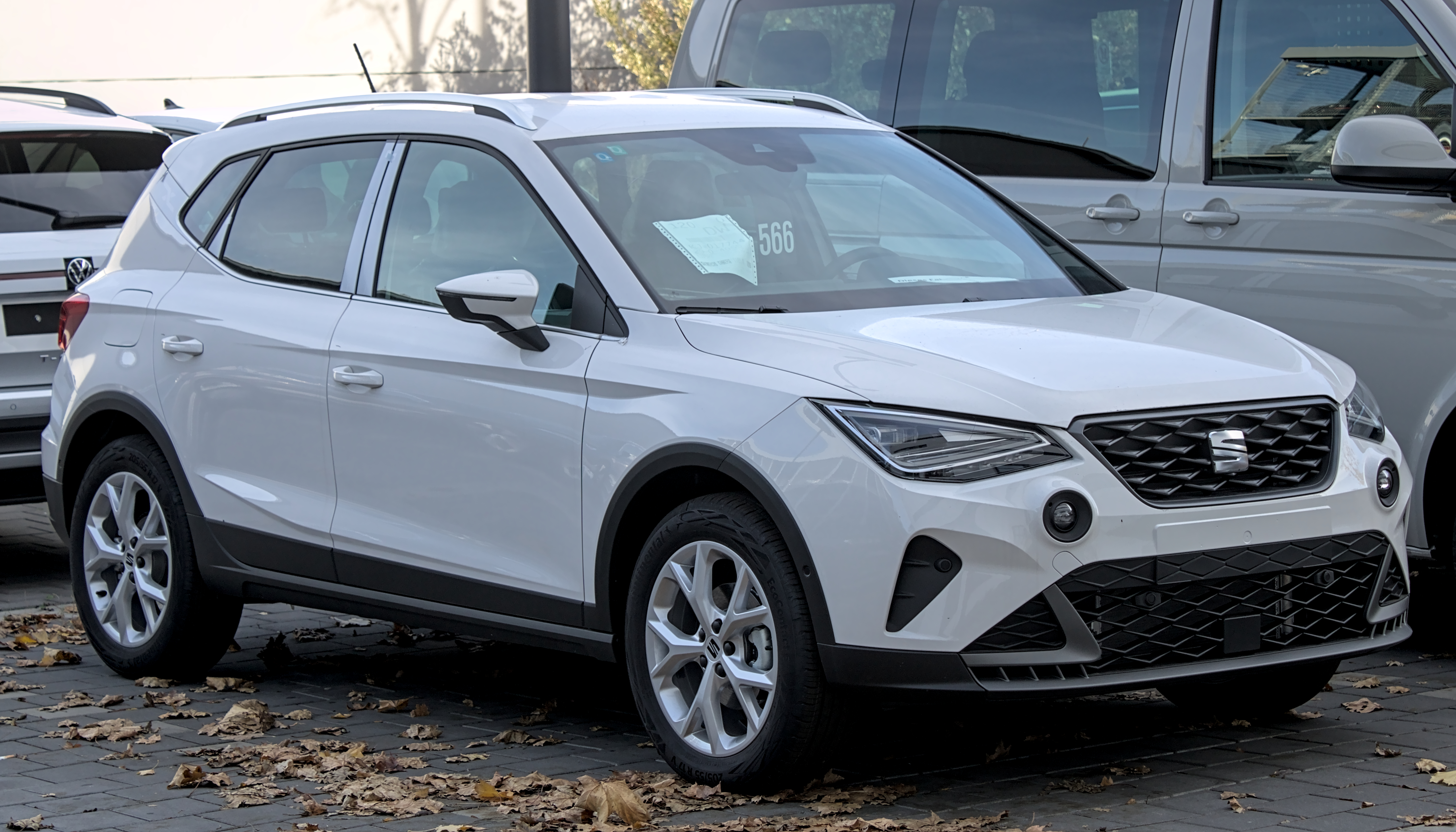
SEAT Arona (first facelift)

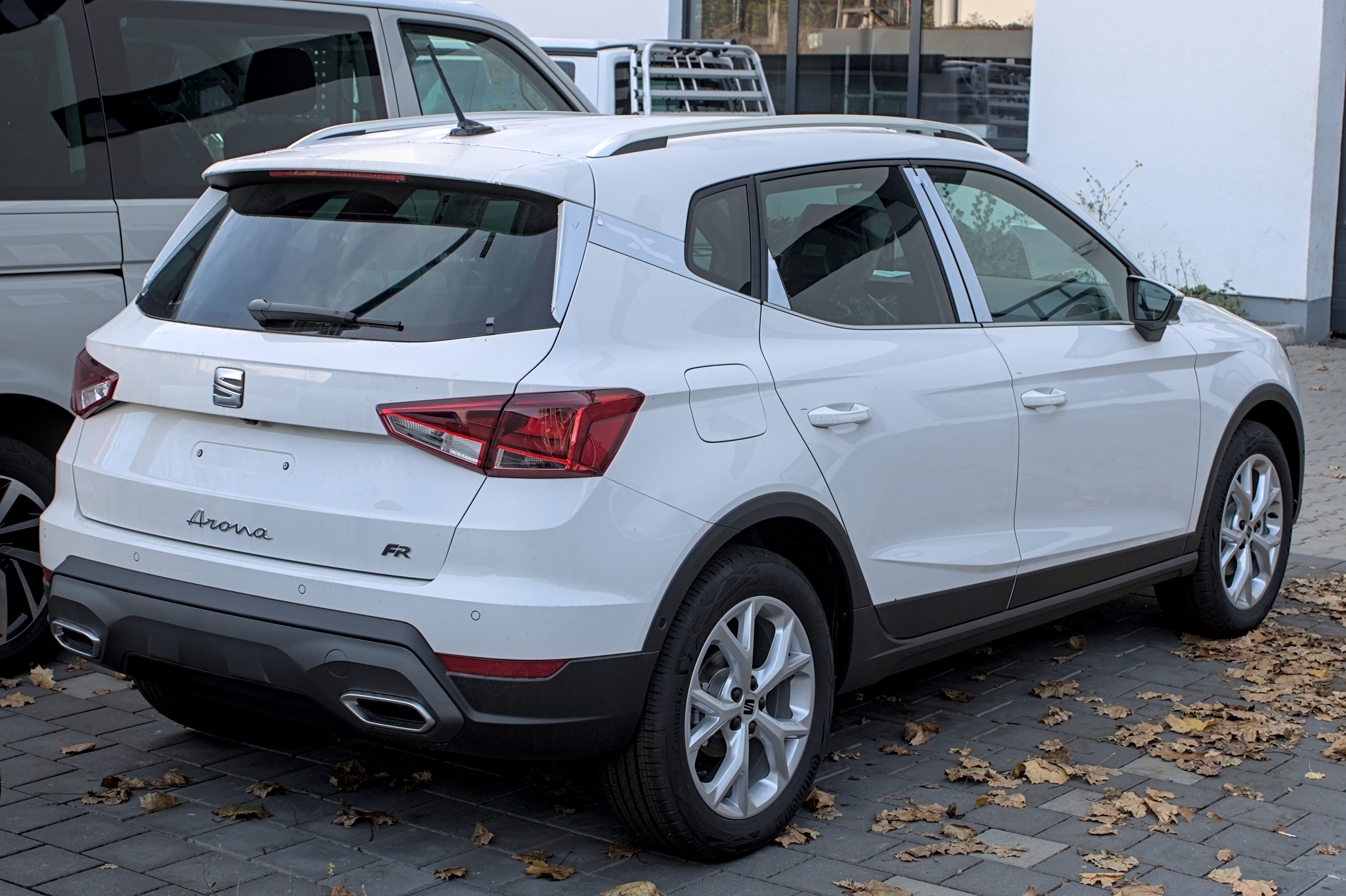
SEAT Arona (first facelift)

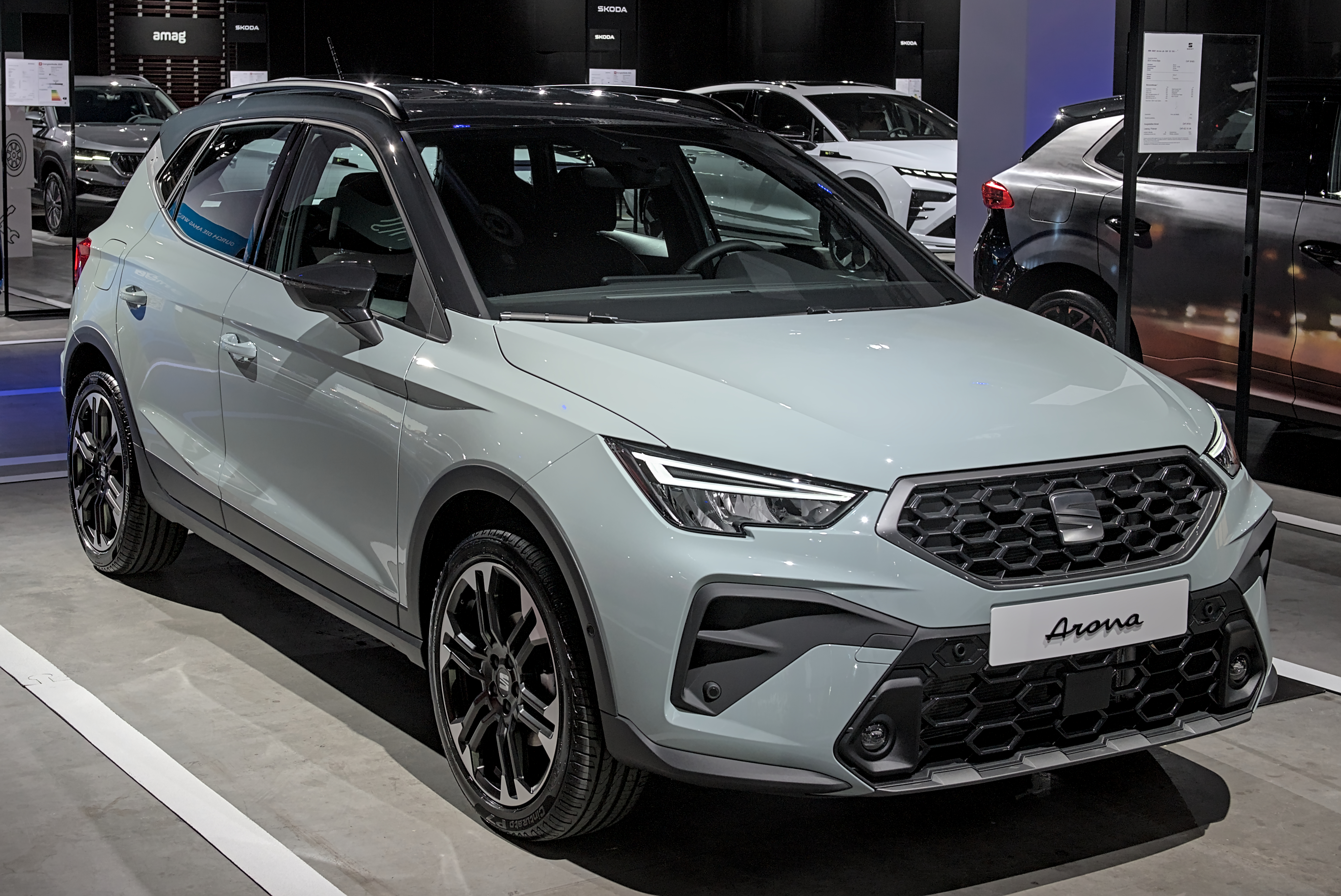
SEAT Arona (second facelift)

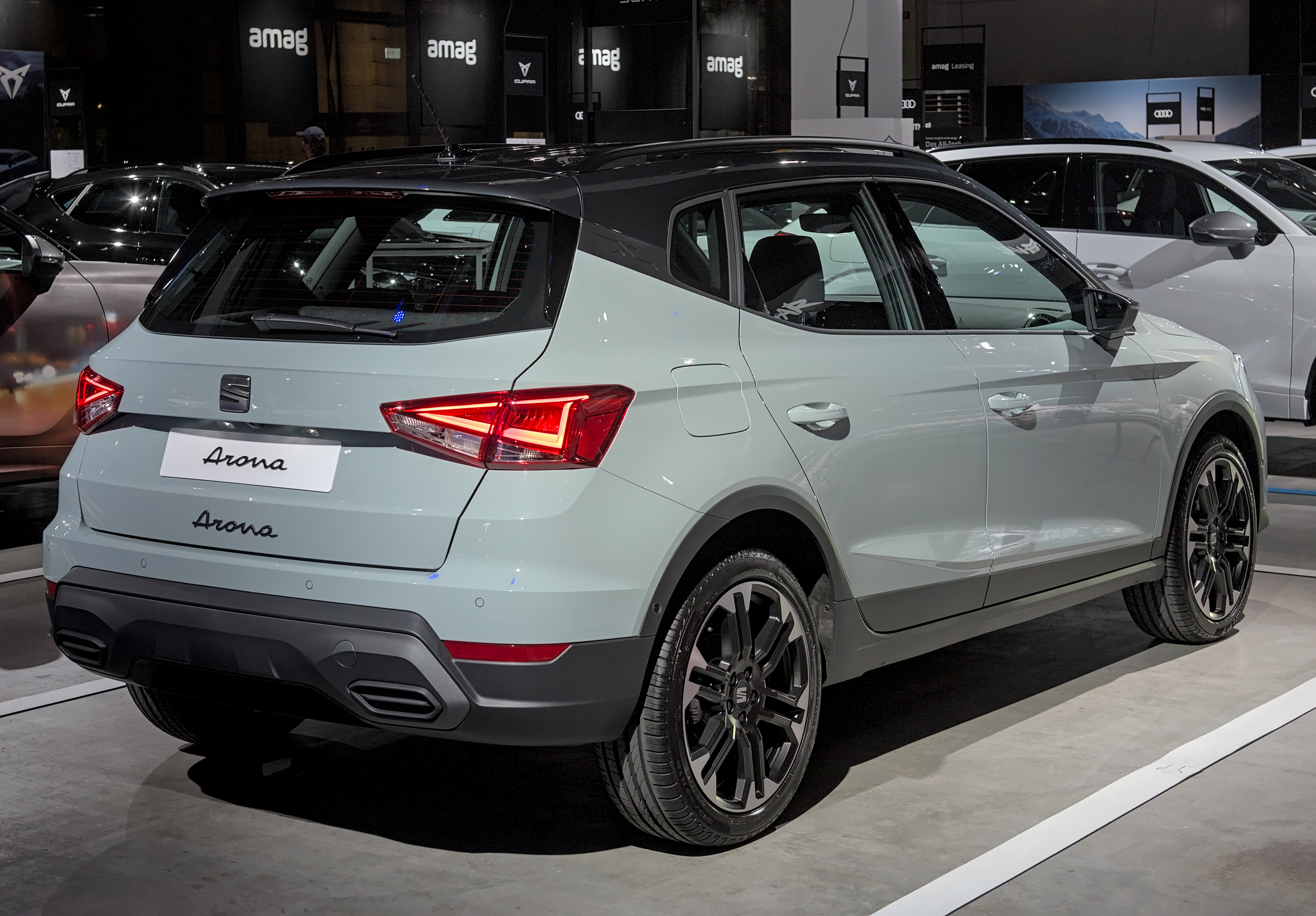
SEAT Arona (second facelift)

== Sales and production figures ==
Year	Sales			Production
Year	Europe (Note: Europe: 2020 EU 27 + UK + Switzerland + Norway + Iceland)	Turkey	Mexico	Production
2017	6,070			17,527
2018	88,730		2,341	110,926
2019	110,648		4,075	134,611
2020	80,765		2,791	78,823
2021	84,984	4,358	5,264	98,656
2022		3,288	2,738	85,717
2023			4,296	76,594
2024				88,478
2025				72,888
