= SEAT Tarraco =

Mid-size crossover SUV manufactured by SEAT (2018–2024)

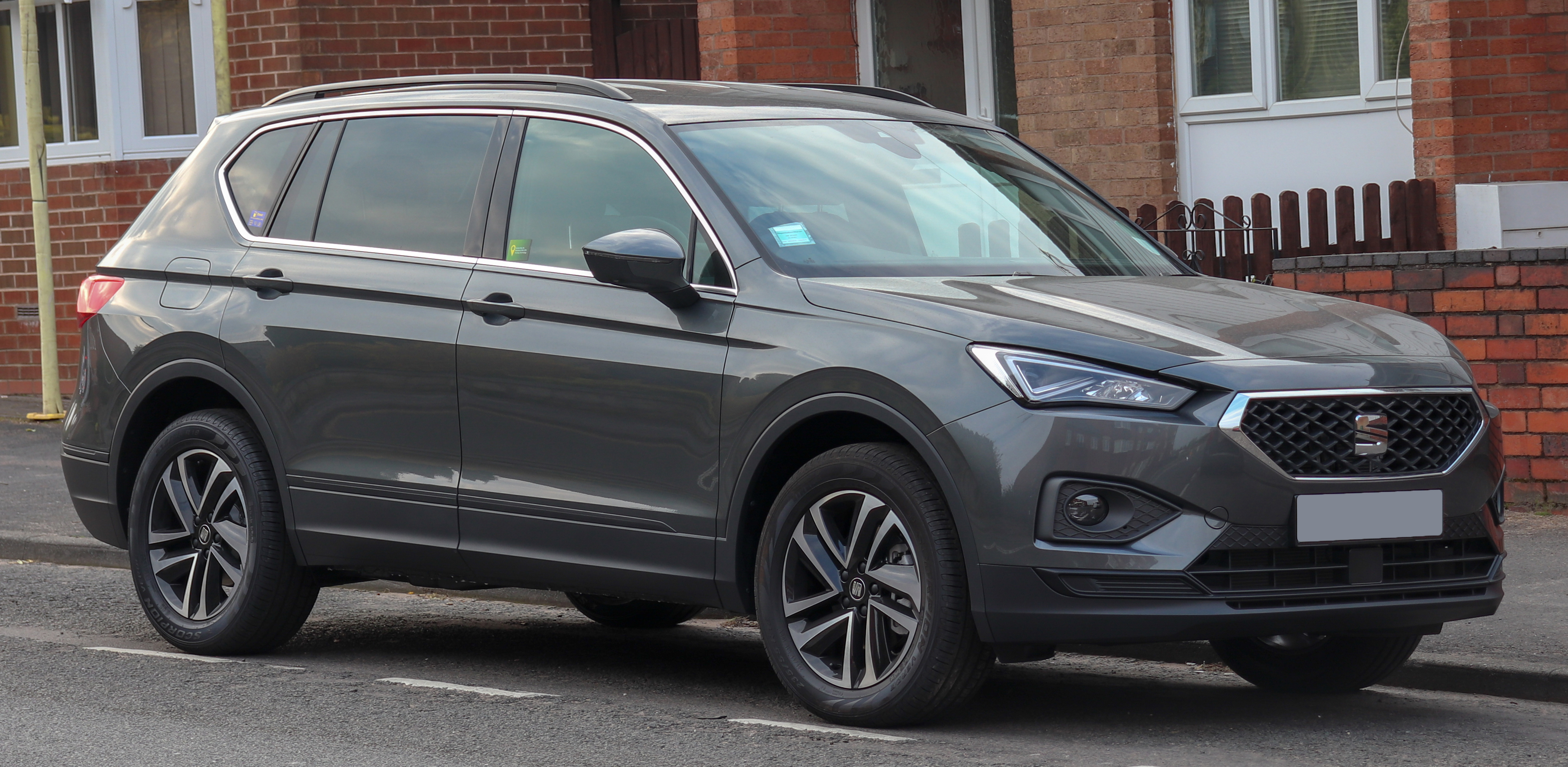

Overview
- Manufacturer: SEAT
- Model code: KN2
- Production: 2018–2024
- Assembly: Germany: Wolfsburg (Wolfsburg Volkswagen Plant)
- Designer: Xavier Guinart under Alejandro Mesonero-Romanos

Body and chassis
- Class: Mid-size crossover SUV (D)
- Body style: 5-door SUV
- Layout: Front-engine, front-wheel-drive; Front-engine, all-wheel-drive (4Drive)
- Platform: Volkswagen Group MQB A2
- Related: Volkswagen Tiguan Allspace; Škoda Kodiaq; Jetta VS7; Audi Q3

Powertrain
- Engine: Petrol: 1.4 L 150 TSI I4 (Mexico); 1.5 L 150 TSI I4; 2.0 L 190 TSI I4; 2.0 L 245 TSI I4; Diesel: 2.0 L 150 TDI I4; 2.0 L 190 TDI I4; 2.0 L 200 TDI I4
- Transmission: 6-speed manual; 7-speed DSG

Dimensions
- Wheelbase: 2,790 mm (109.8 in)
- Length: 4,735 mm (186.4 in)
- Width: 1,839 mm (72.4 in)
- Height: 1,658–1,674 mm (65.3–65.9 in)

The SEAT Tarraco is a mid-size crossover SUV (D-segment) manufactured by Spanish automaker SEAT. It is the flagship SUV of the Spanish car maker above the SEAT Arona and the SEAT Ateca, optionally available with seven seats. It is based on the Volkswagen Group's MQB-A2 platform, while closely related to the Volkswagen Tiguan Allspace and the Škoda Kodiaq.

It is named after Tarraco, the ancient Roman city that is now the Spanish city of Tarragona, and it is manufactured in the Wolfsburg Volkswagen Plant in Germany. The production model was presented on 18 September 2018, and debuted at the 2018 Paris Motor Show in October 2018.

In July 2024, SEAT announced the Tarraco has ended production in the second quarter of 2024 without a second generation model planned despite a spokesperson from SEAT stated, "The Seat Tarraco has been a success. But there will be no Tarraco successor." The reason for the discontinuation was to focus on marketing the Cupra Terramar that is 200 mm (7.9 in) shorter than the Tarraco and competes in a similar segment.

== Name ==
The name of the vehicle is intended to commemorate Tarraco, the former capital of the Roman province of Hispania Tarraconensis. This corresponds to the ancient name of the current city of Tarragona (Catalonia, Spain).

The name of the SUV was determined by a public vote and everyone was invited to suggest a name related to a Spanish geography with a maximum of three syllables. The initiative began in 2017, and in total, 10,130 suggestions from more than 130,000 people were received. After a preliminary examination based on linguistic and legal criteria, SEAT chose nine options, Abrera, Alborán, Arán, Aranda, Ávila, Donosti, Tarifa, Tarraco and Teide – among which Alborán, Aranda, Ávila and Tarraco were qualified for a final vote. With the Tarraco, SEAT for the first time in its history, let the name of one of its models be chosen among the people.

Originally, the name of the new SUV should have been announced in October 2017, however due to the independence referendum held in Catalonia at the time, SEAT finally announced the name on 19 February 2018. Of more than 150,000 participants, more than 35 percent voted in favour of Tarraco.

== Overview ==
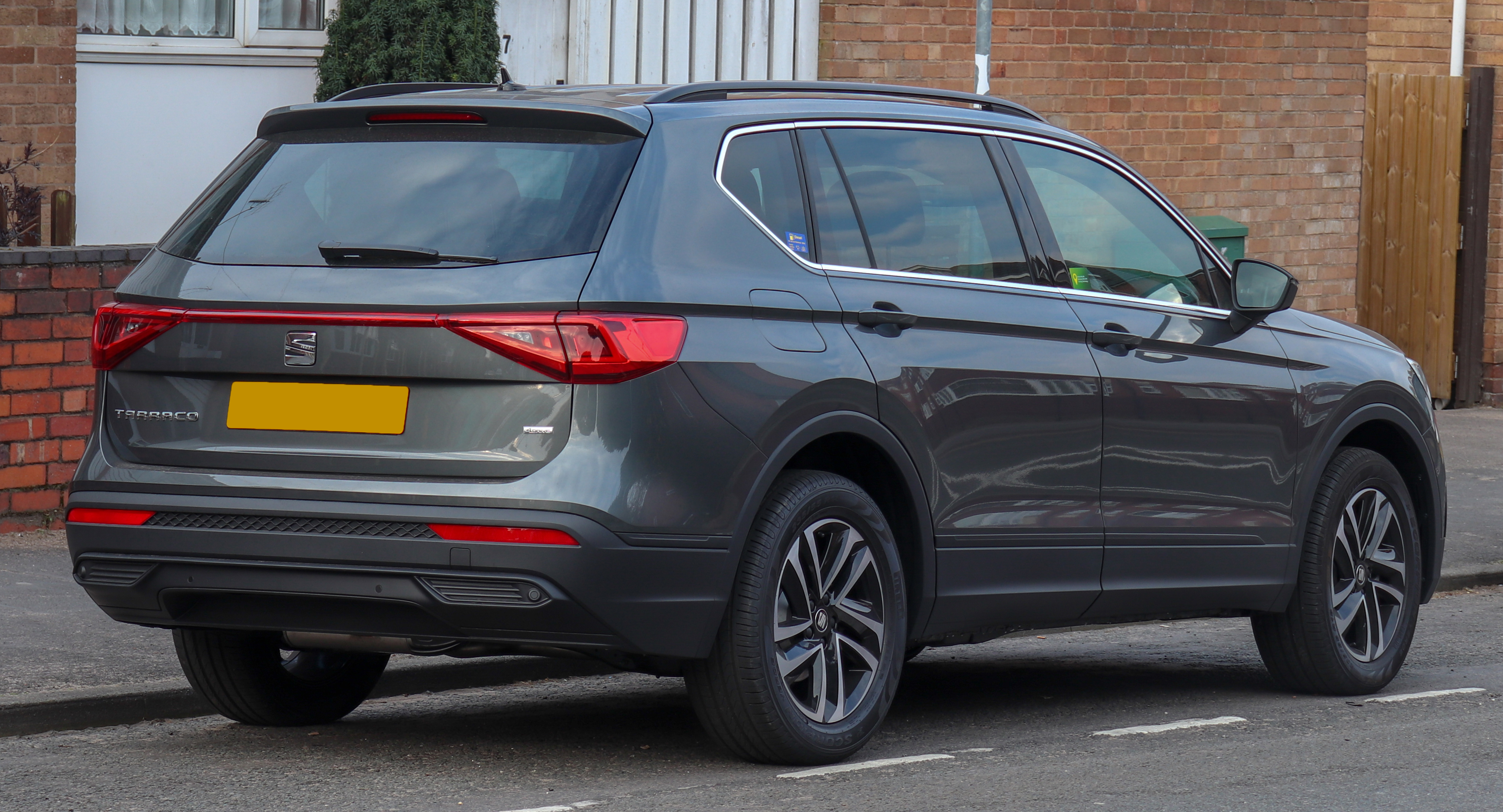
Rear view

The vehicle was launched in Tarragona, which is a town the car was named after. The Tarraco shares mechanical underpinnings with the Volkswagen Tiguan and Škoda Kodiaq, while its door panels are shared with the Volkswagen Tiguan Allspace. The car is built alongside the Tiguan at Volkswagen's factory in Wolfsburg, Germany. After the SEAT Alhambra MPV was discontinued, the Tarraco is the only SEAT model to offer a maximum of seven seats.

The Tarraco opens a new design language in SEAT, highlighting the front with a large front grille and new optics, and the return to an aesthetic bet already used by Giugiaro for SEAT at the beginning of the 90s; the unification of the rear lights telephone type, being influenced to the rest of the models of the brand from here on.

At launch, the SEAT Tarraco is available to order in four trim levels: SE, SE Technology, XCELLENCE and XCELLENCE LUX. All models come as standard with metallic paint, DAB radio, ‘Full Link’ (Android Auto and Apple CarPlay connectivity), 17-inch alloy wheels, an alarm and three-zone climate control.

== Powertrain ==
Two four-cylinder petrol engines are offered from launch: a 150 PS (110 kW; 148 hp) 1.5-litre and a 190 PS (140 kW; 187 hp) 2.0-litre. The former comes with a 6-speed manual transmission and front-wheel drive, while the latter gets a 7-speed dual-clutch automatic and four-wheel drive. A 2.0-litre four-cylinder diesel is offered in 150 PS (110 kW; 148 hp) or 190 PS (140 kW; 187 hp) versions; the first can be specified with a manual transmission and front-wheel drive or a dual-clutch automatic with four-wheel drive, with the more powerful engine limited to the automatic/four-wheel-drive combination.

Model	Displacement	Series	Power	Torque	Transmission
Petrol engines
1.4 TSI 150	1395 cc I4	EA211 CZDA	150 PS (110 kW; 148 hp)	250 N⋅m (184 lb⋅ft)	6-speed DSG
1.5 TSI 150	1,498 cc I4	EA211 evo (DADA, DPCA)	150 PS (110 kW; 148 hp)	250 N⋅m (184 lb⋅ft)	6-speed manual
2.0 TSI 190 4Drive	1,984 cc I4	EA888 (DKZA)	190 PS (140 kW; 187 hp)	320 N⋅m (236 lb⋅ft)	7-speed DSG
2.0 TSI 245 4Drive	1,984 cc I4	EA888 (DNPA)	245 PS (180 kW; 242 hp)	370 N⋅m (273 lb⋅ft)	7-speed DSG
Diesel engines
2.0 TDI 150 SCR	1,968 cc I4	EA288 (DFGA)	150 PS (110 kW; 148 hp)	320 N⋅m (236 lb⋅ft)	6-speed manual
2.0 TDI 150 SCR 4Drive	1,968 cc I4	EA288 (DFGA)	150 PS (110 kW; 148 hp)	340 N⋅m (251 lb⋅ft)	7-speed DSG
2.0 TDI 190 SCR 4Drive	1,968 cc I4	EA288 (DFHA)	190 PS (140 kW; 187 hp)	400 N⋅m (295 lb⋅ft)	7-speed DSG
2.0 TDI 200 SCR 4Drive	1,968 cc I4	EA288 Evo (DTUA)	200 PS (147 kW; 197 hp)	400 N⋅m (295 lb⋅ft)	7-speed DSG

== Safety ==
=== Latin NCAP ===
The German-made Tarraco in its most basic Latin American market configuration with 7 airbags and ESC received 5 stars for adult occupants, 5 stars for toddlers, and Advanced Award from Latin NCAP 2.0 in 2019.

Latin NCAP 2.0 test results Seat Tarraco + 7 Airbags (2019, based on Euro NCAP 2008)
Test	Points	Stars
Adult occupant:	32.35/34.0	5 /5 stars
Child occupant:	42.73/49.00	5 /5 stars

=== Euro NCAP ===
Euro NCAP test results SEAT Tarraco (2019)
Test	Points	%
Overall:	5 /5 stars	
Adult occupant:	37.1	97%
Child occupant:	41.6	84%
Pedestrian:	38.0	79%
Safety assist:	10.3	79%

=== ANCAP ===
ANCAP test results SEAT Tarraco (2019, aligned with Euro NCAP)
Test	Points	%
Overall:	5 /5 stars	
Adult occupant:	37	97%
Child occupant:	41.5	84%
Pedestrian:	38	79%
Safety assist:	10.6	81%

== Gallery ==
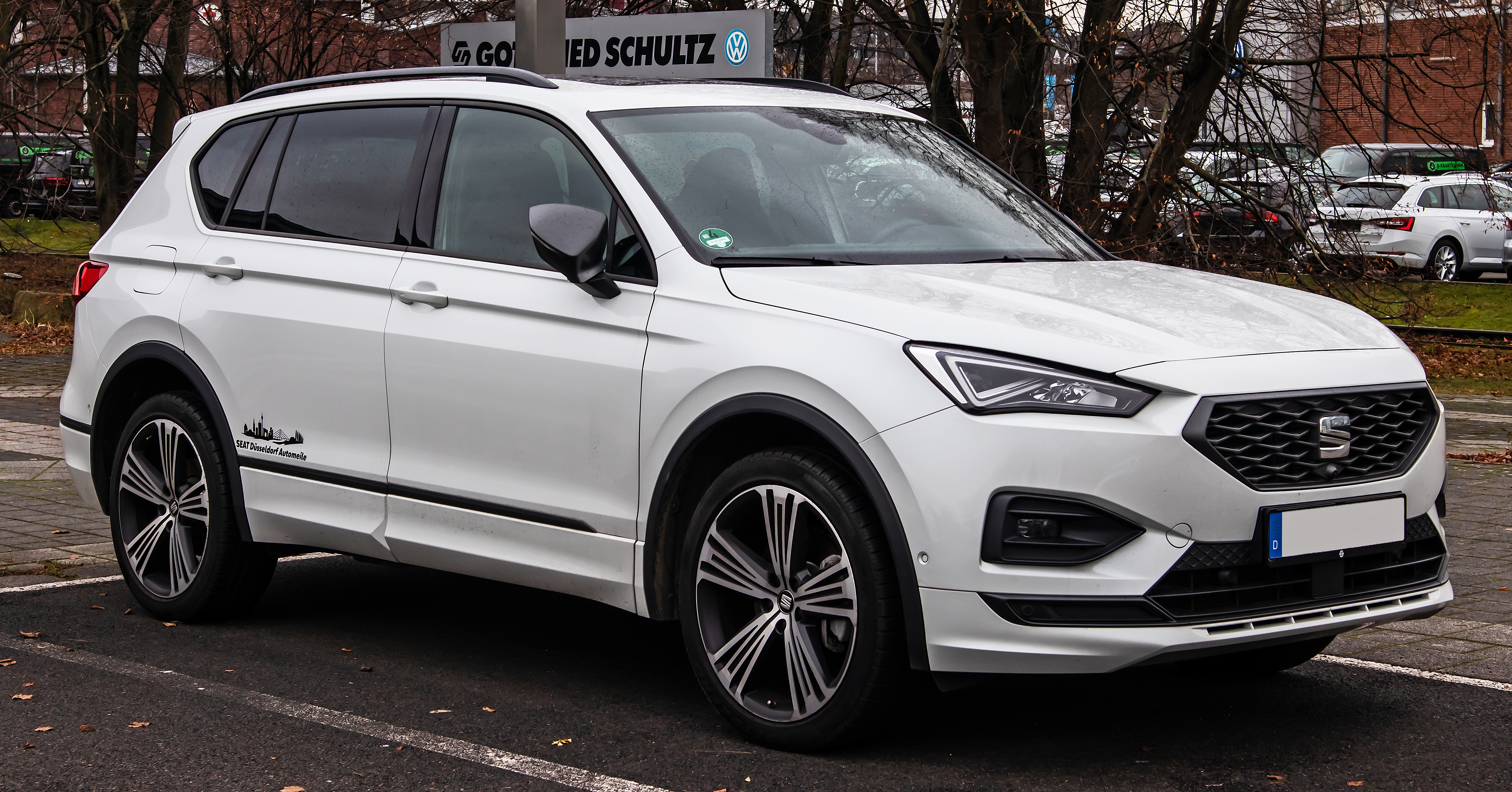
SEAT Tarraco 2.0 TDI 4Drive FR

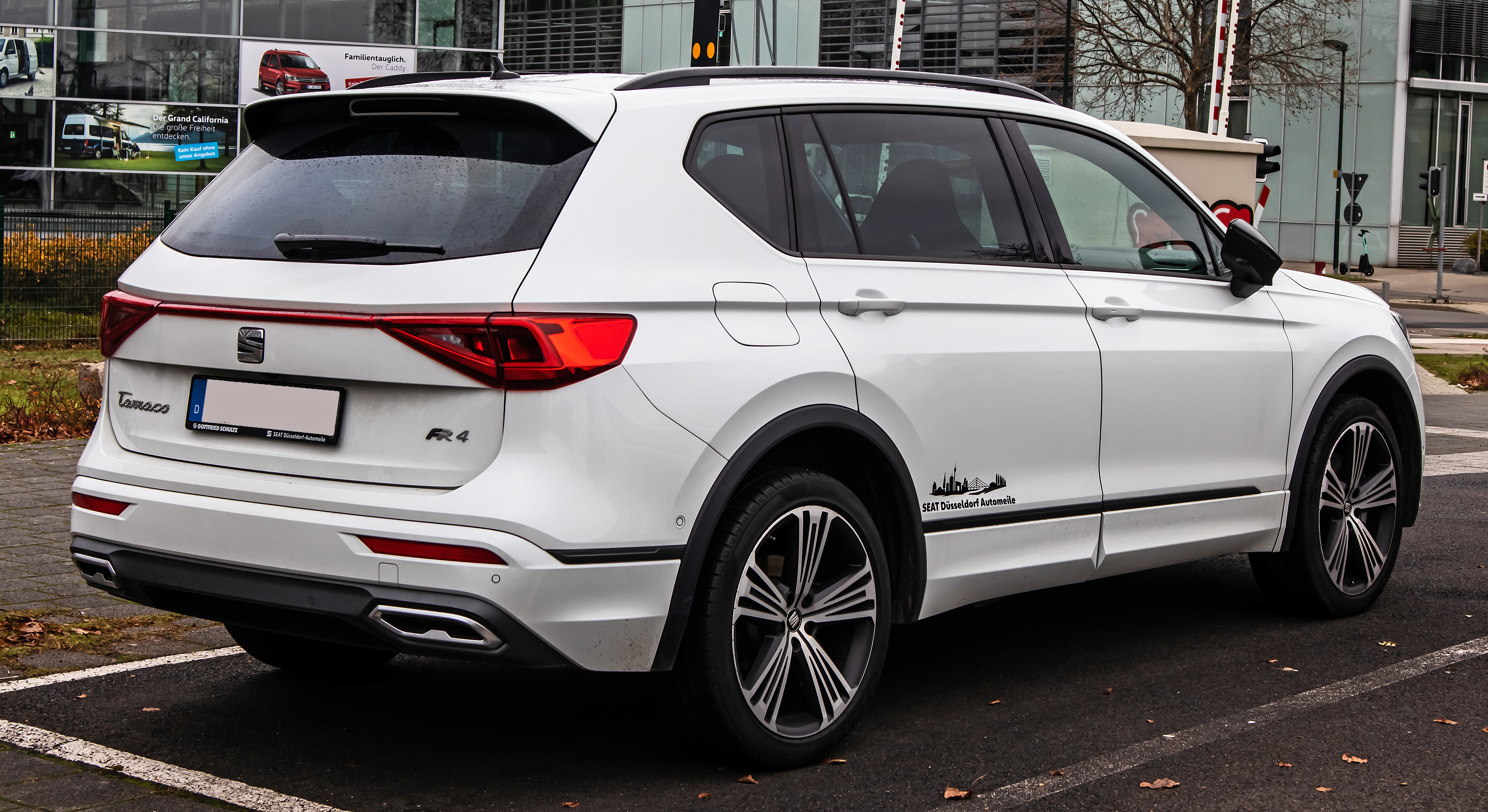
SEAT Tarraco 2.0 TDI 4Drive FR

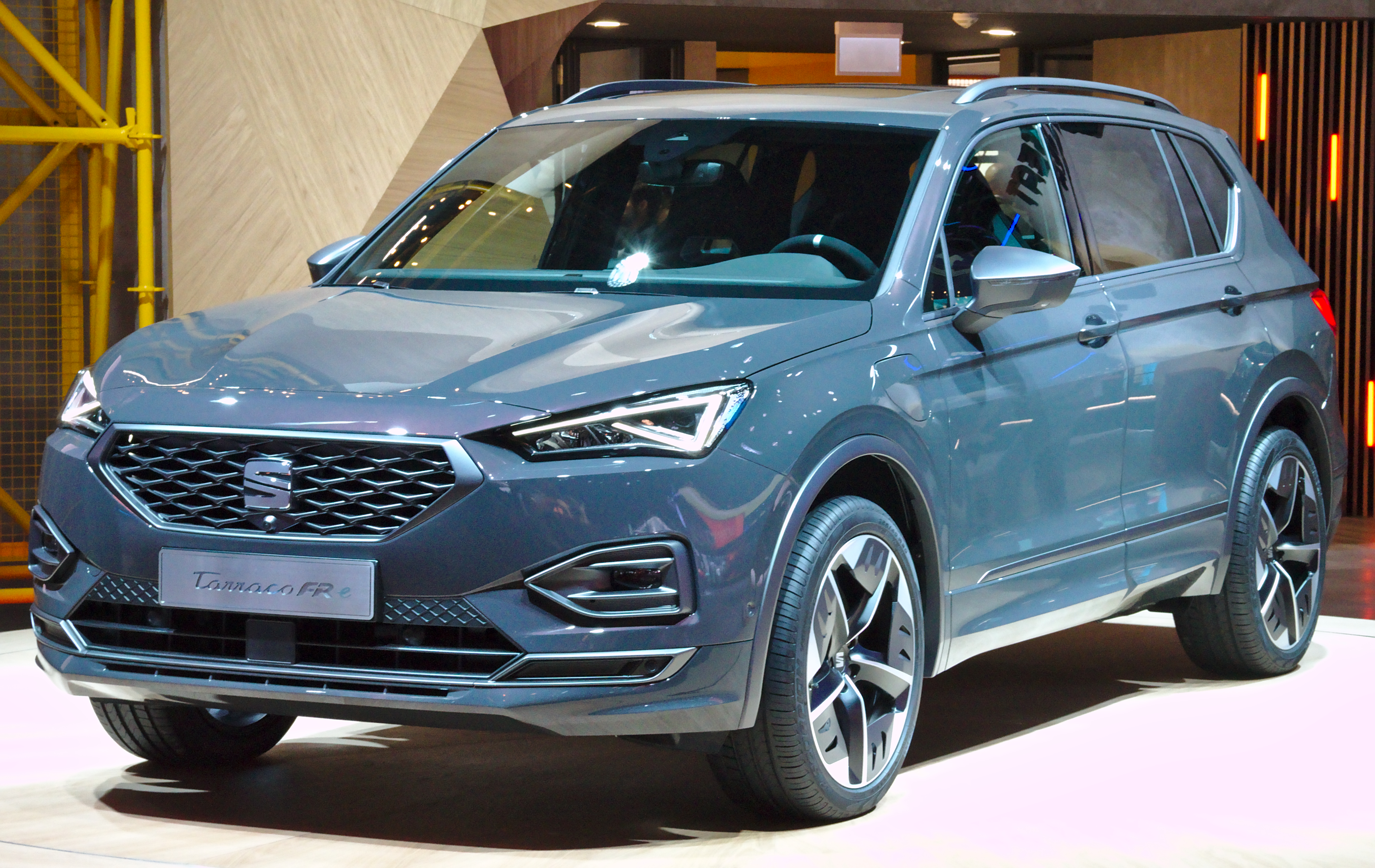
SEAT Tarraco PHEV FR

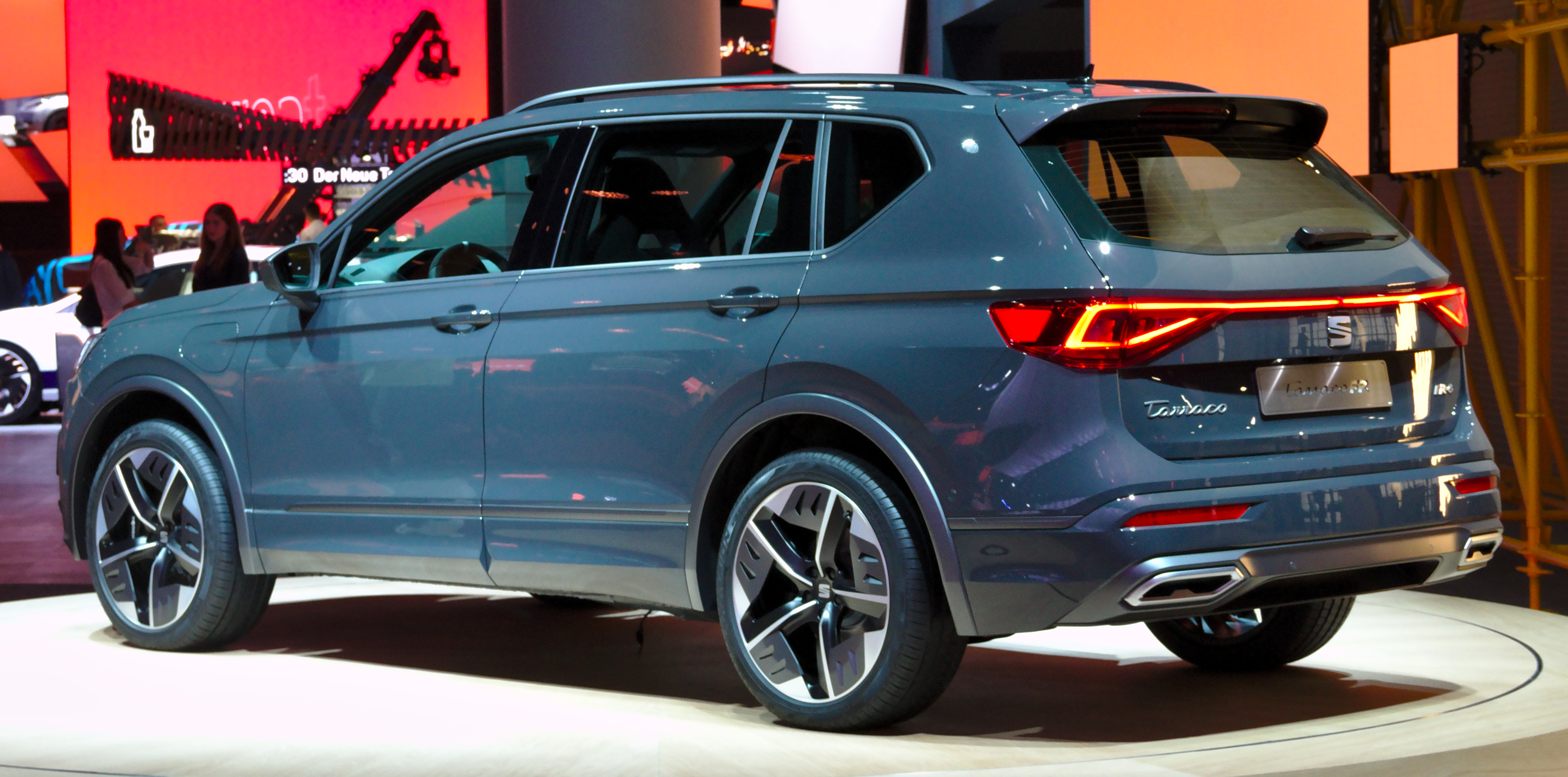
Rear

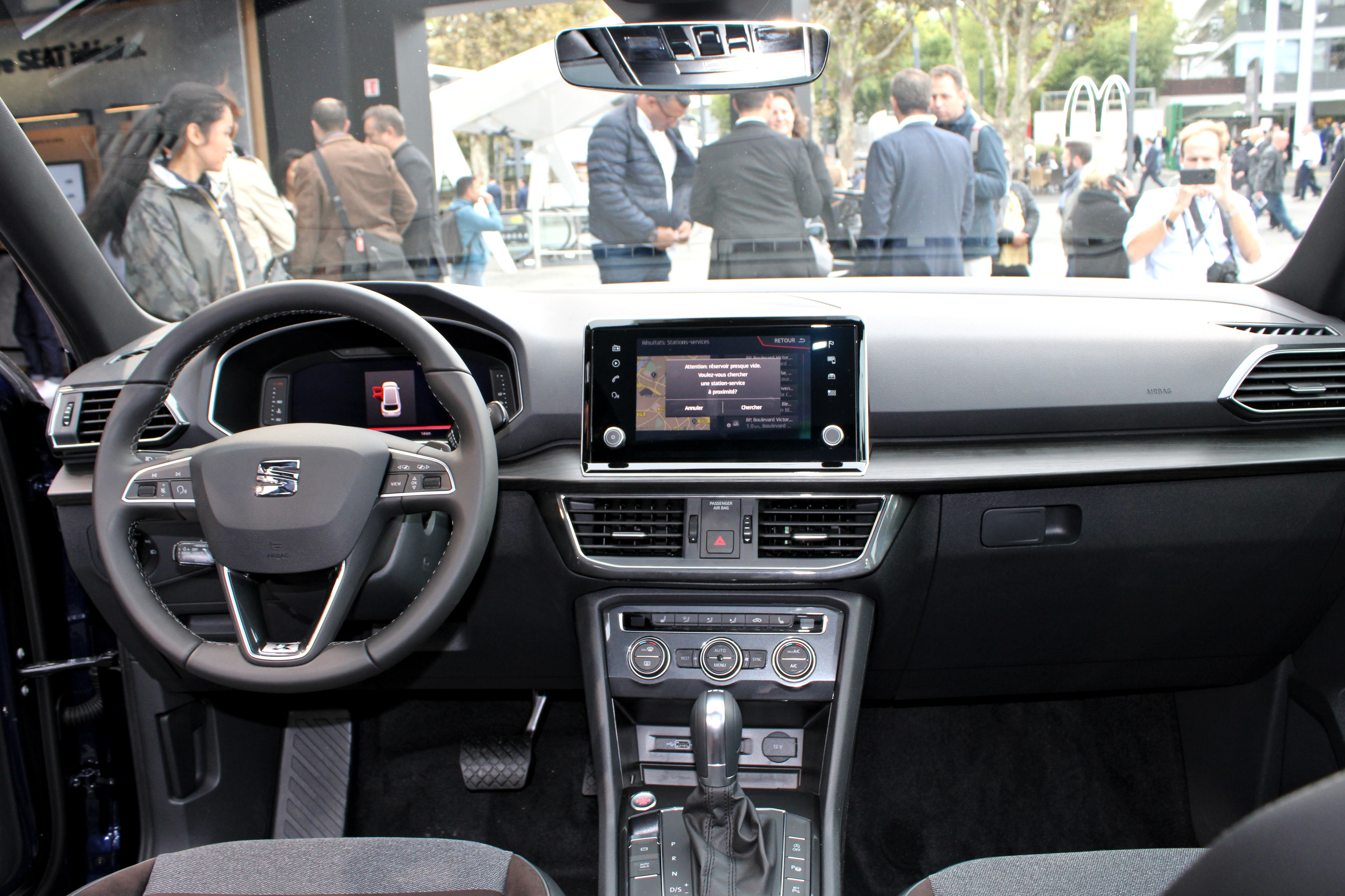
Interior

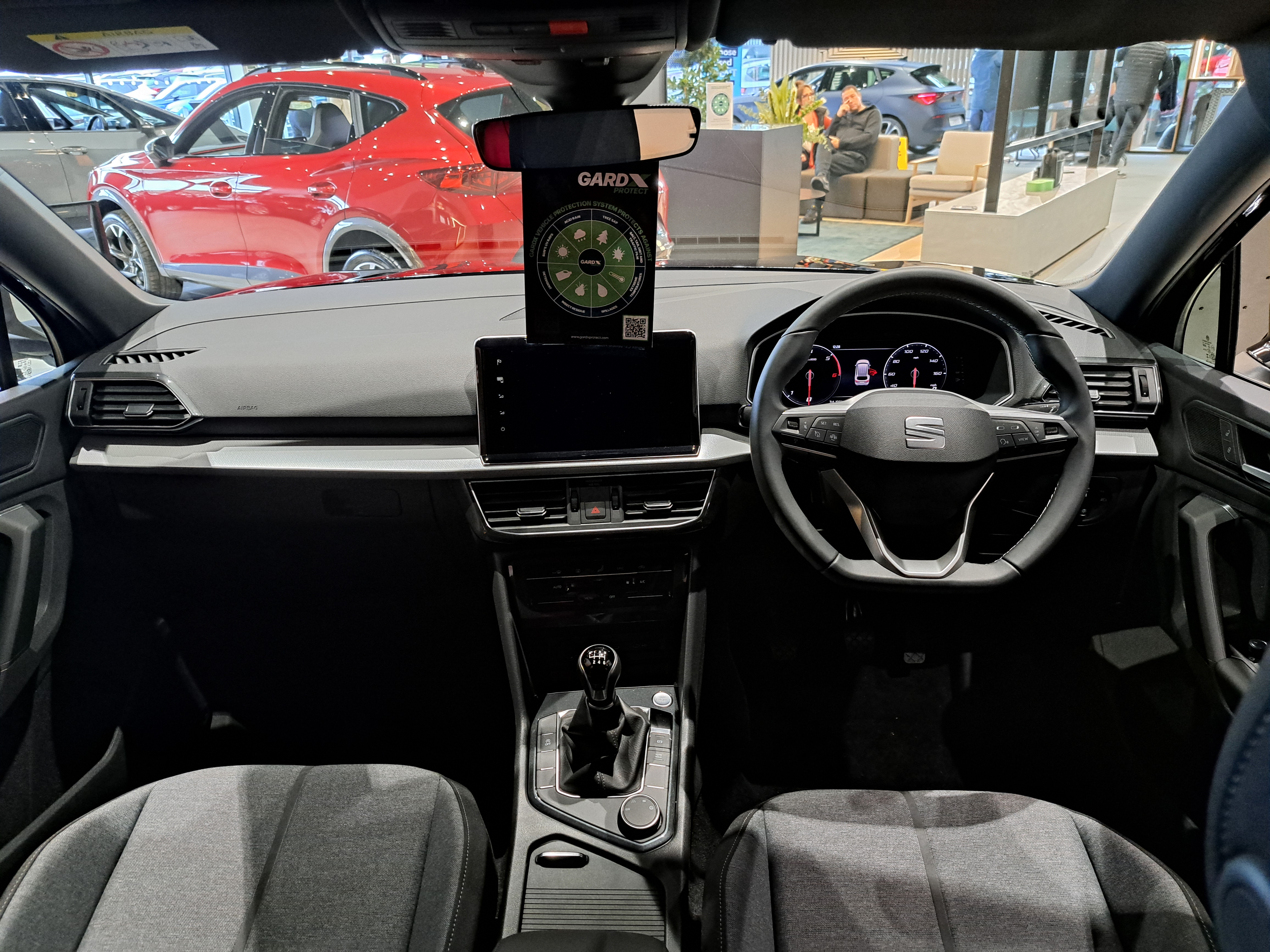
Interior (updated)

== Sales and production figures ==
Year	Sales		Production
Year	Europe (Note: Europe: 2020 EU 27 + UK + Switzerland + Norway + Iceland)	Mexico	Production
2018	258		2,398
2019	29,615	647	38,721
2020	21,229	768	18,726
2021	22,437	786	22,437
2022	12,872	622	12,453
2023		813	25,562
2024			8,856
