= SEAT IBL =

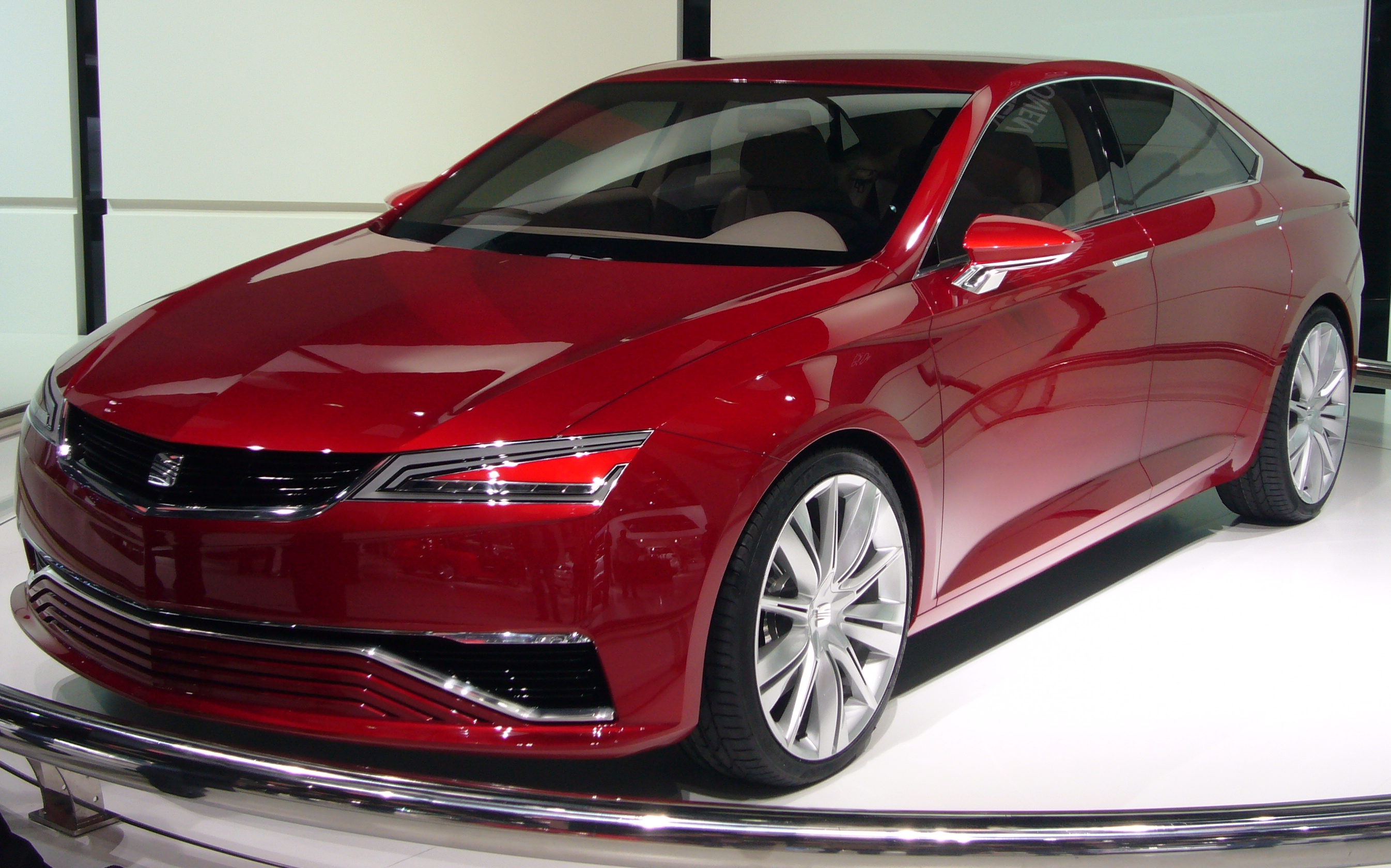

Overview
- Manufacturer: SEAT
- Production: 2011 (Concept Car)
- Designer: Alejandro Mesonero-Romanos

Body and chassis
- Class: Mid Size (D)
- Body style: 4 door saloon

Dimensions
- Length: 4,670 mm (183.9 in)
- Width: 1,850 mm (72.8 in)

The SEAT IBL is a concept car which was first shown at the 2011 Frankfurt Motor Show by Spanish car manufacturer SEAT. It is a four-door saloon that was intended to showcase the styling of future SEAT models, and featured a plug in hybrid powertrain. The design was expected to influence the next generation Exeo, which never made it to production however. The IBL was displayed with 20-inch alloy wheels.

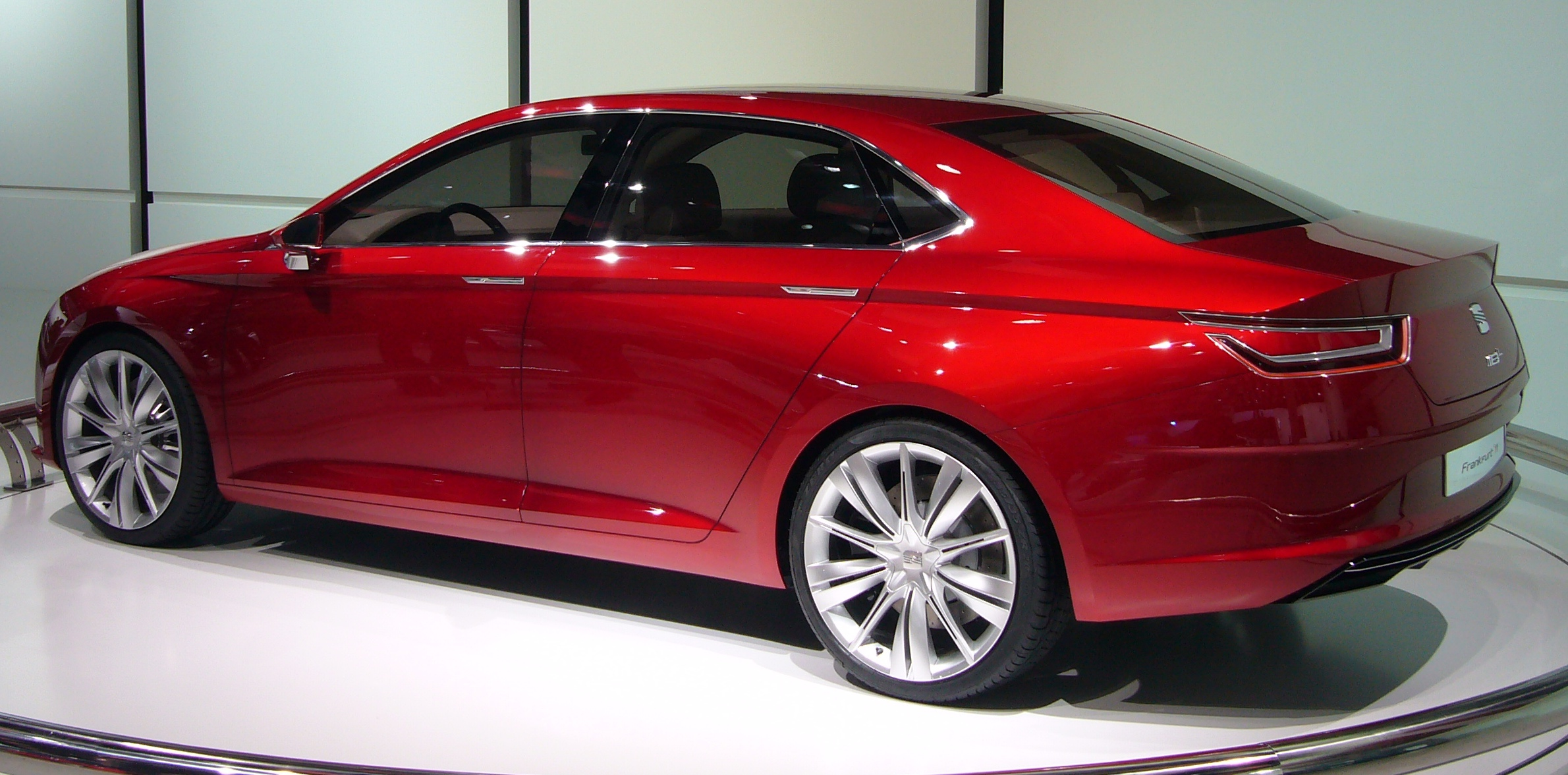
Rear view
