= Cupra Formentor =

Compact crossover SUV

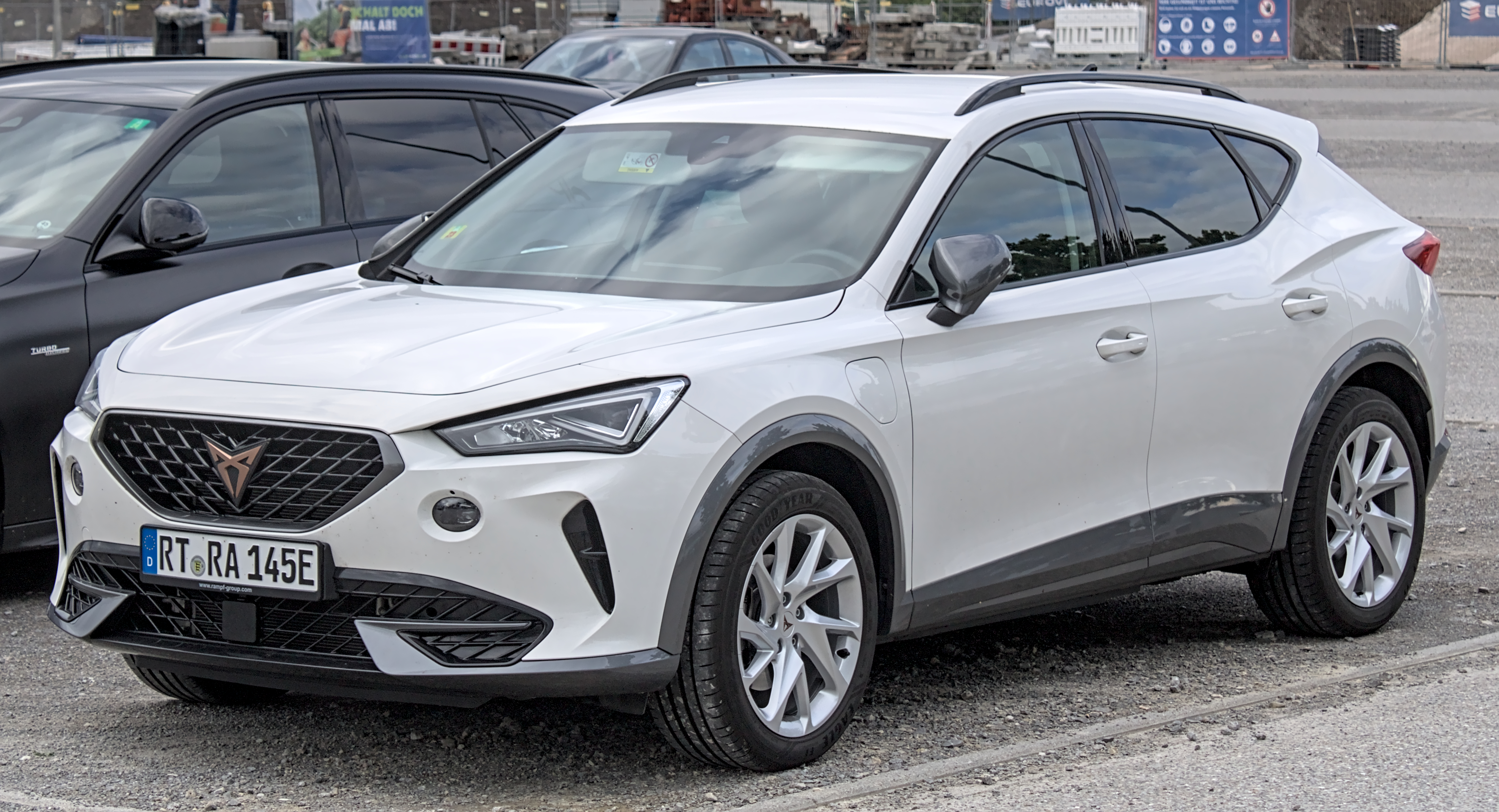

Overview
- Manufacturer: SEAT
- Model code: Type SE316
- Production: September 2020–present
- Assembly: Spain: Martorell, Catalonia
- Designer: Alberto Torrecillas under Alejandro Mesonero-Romanos

Body and chassis
- Class: Compact crossover SUV (C)
- Body style: 5-door SUV
- Layout: Front-engine, front-wheel drive or all-wheel drive
- Platform: Volkswagen Group MQB Evo
- Related: SEAT León Mk4

Powertrain
- Engine: Petrol: 1.5 L TSI I4; 2.0 L TSI I4; 2.5 L TFSI I5 (VZ5); Petrol plug-in hybrid: 1.4 L TSI I4; 1.5 L TSI I4; Diesel: 2.0 L TDI I4
- Transmission: 6-speed manual 6-speed DSG; 7-speed DSG
- Battery: 13 kWh (plug-in hybrid); 20 kWh
- Electric range: 50 km (31 mi) (PHEV, 13 kWh); 117–126 km (73–78 mi) (PHEV, 20 kWh)

Dimensions
- Wheelbase: 2,680 mm (105.5 in)
- Length: 4,450 mm (175.2 in)
- Width: 1,839 mm (72.4 in)
- Height: 1,511 mm (59.5 in)
- Kerb weight: 1,359–1,667 kg (2,996–3,675 lb)

The Cupra Formentor is a compact crossover SUV (C-segment) manufactured by the Spanish car manufacturer SEAT under their Cupra performance-oriented sub-brand. Marketed as a coupé SUV, it is the first car designed specifically for the sub-brand. The production version was revealed in March 2020, after its unveiling was postponed when the COVID-19 pandemic led to the cancellation of the 2020 Geneva Motor Show. It was previewed as a near-production concept vehicle at the 2019 Geneva Motor Show. It is named after the Formentor peninsula on the Spanish island of Mallorca. Production of the Formentor started in late September 2020.

== Overview ==
=== Specification ===
The Formentor is available with a 245 PS (180 kW; 242 hp) 1.4-litre plug-in hybrid, an entry-level 1.5-litre turbo generating 150 PS (110 kW; 148 hp), a 2.0-litre turbo generating 310 PS (228 kW; 306 hp) available for VZ models (derived from the Spanish word veloz, meaning "fast"), and a range-topping VZ5 model with 2.5-litre five cylinder turbo generating 390 PS (287 kW; 385 hp). The plug-in hybrid combination delivers an approximate range of 50 km (31 mi) with a full-electric mode.

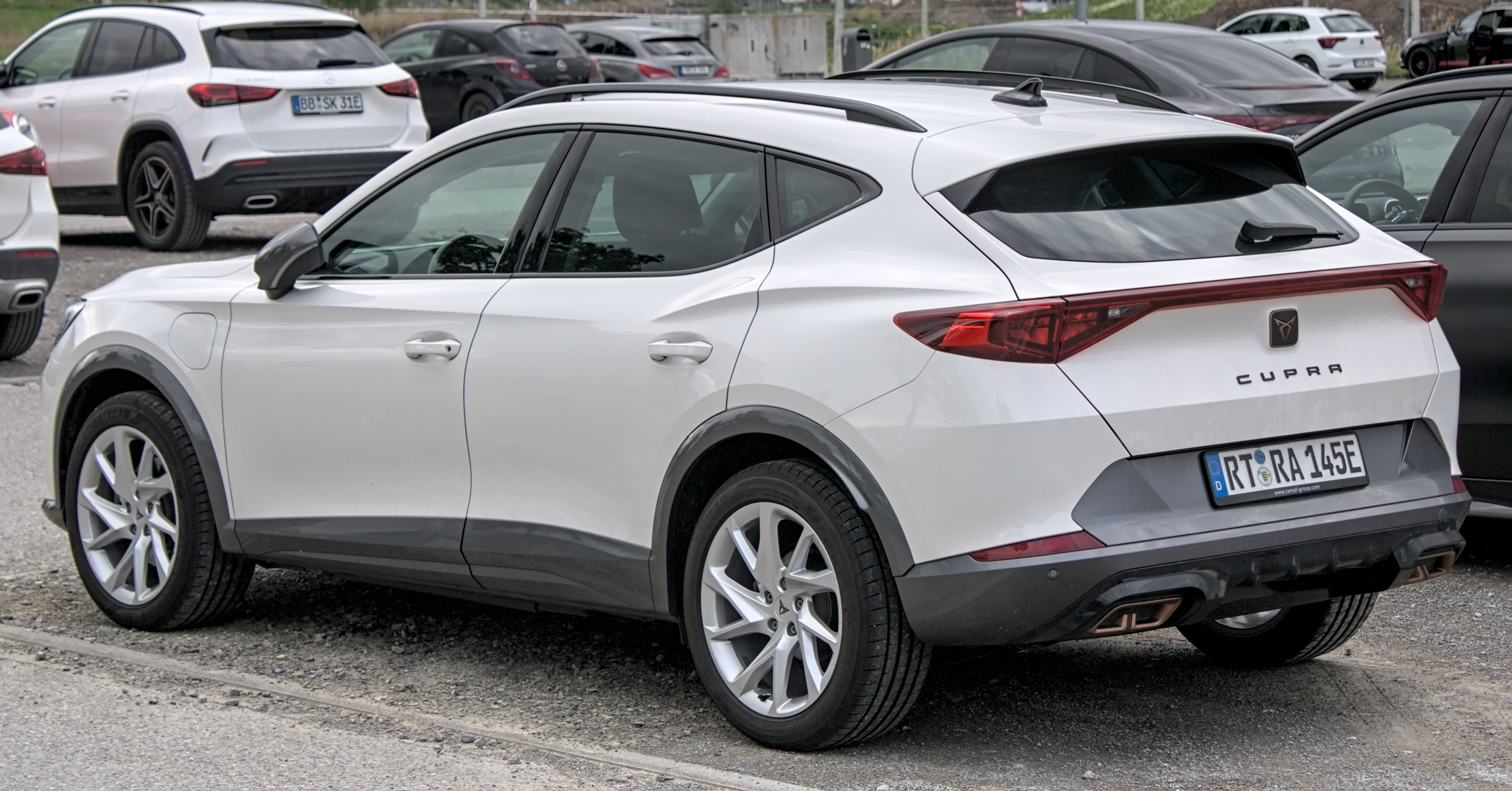
Rear view

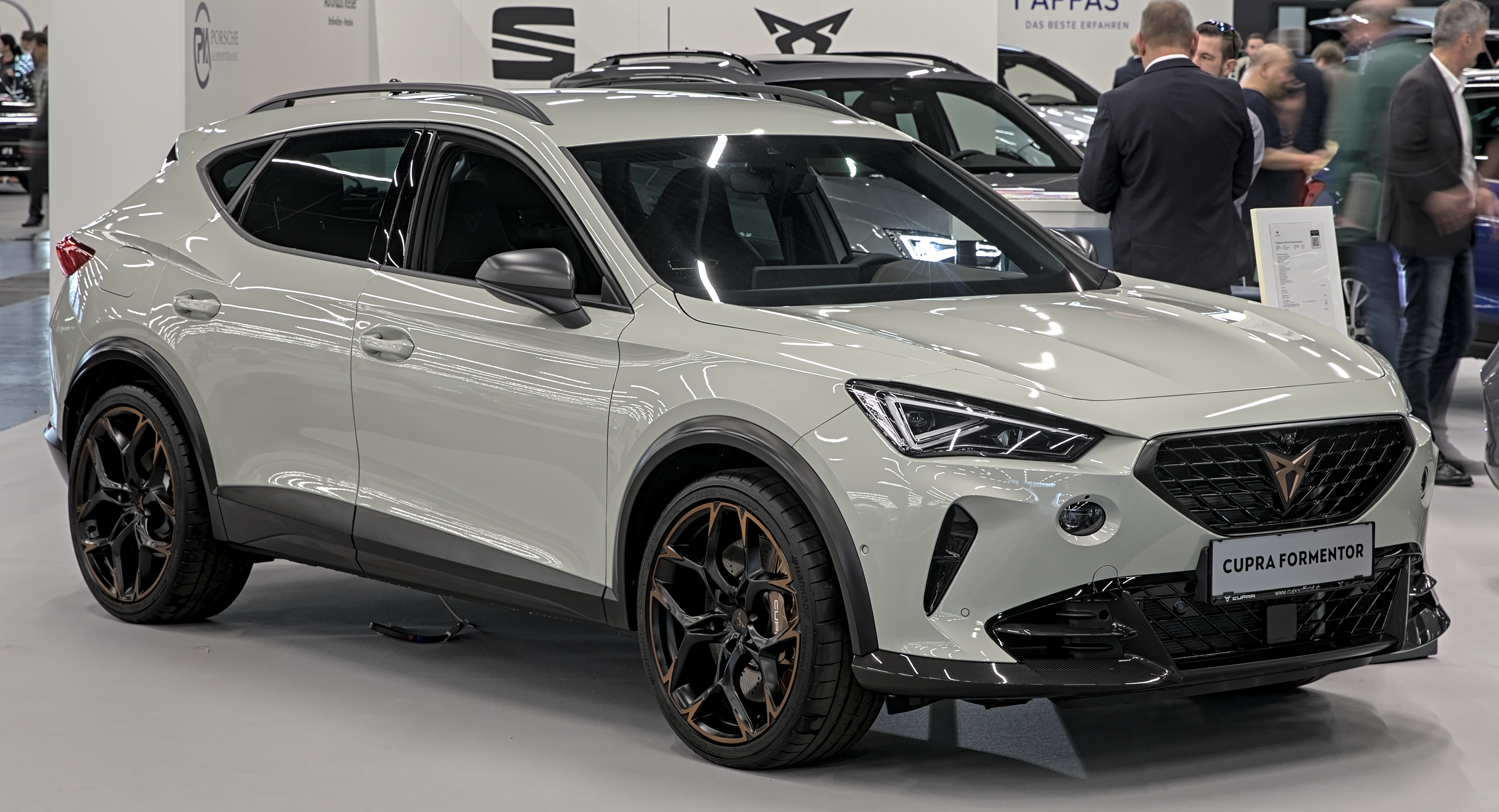
Cupra Formentor VZ5

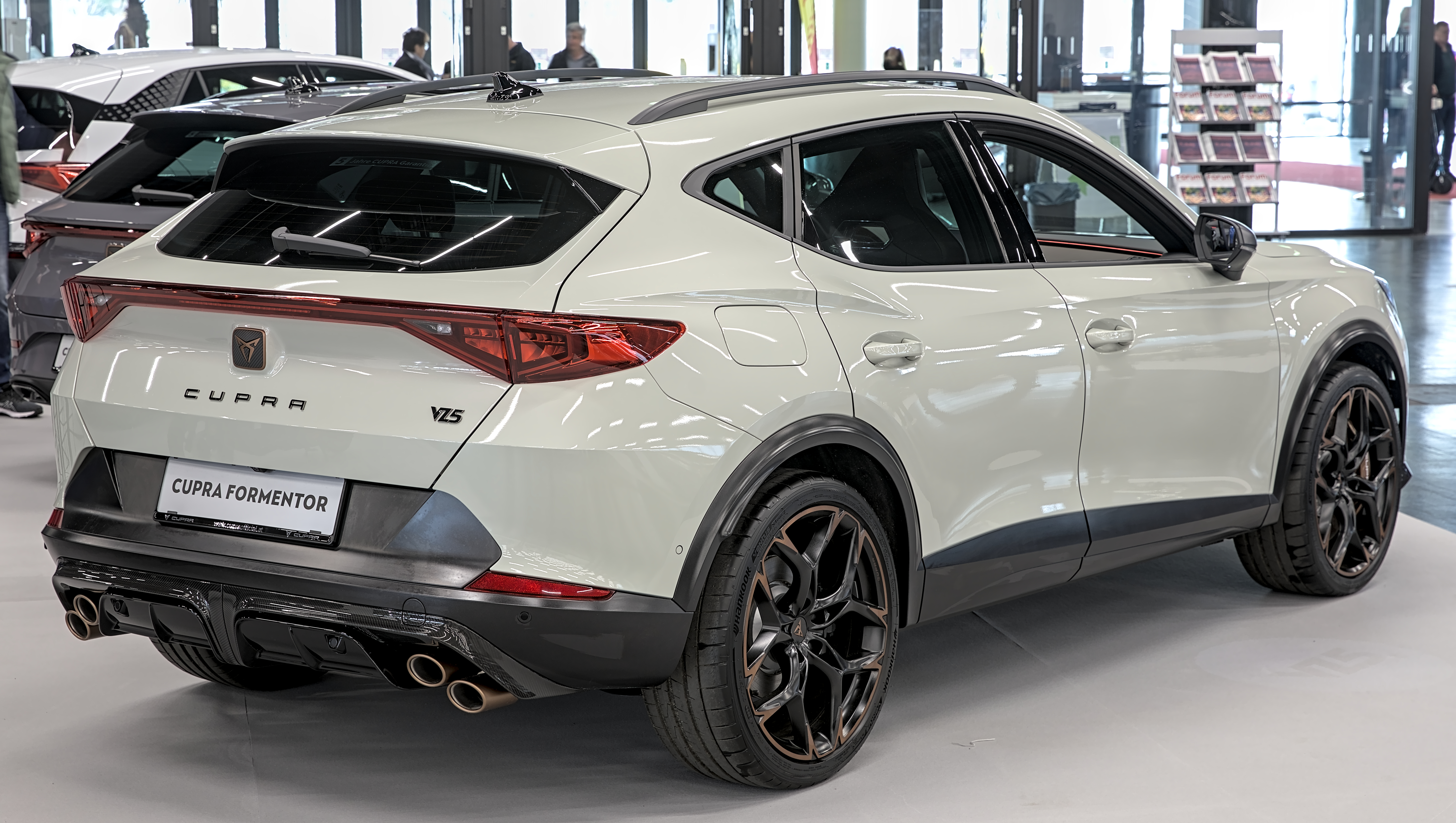
Rear view

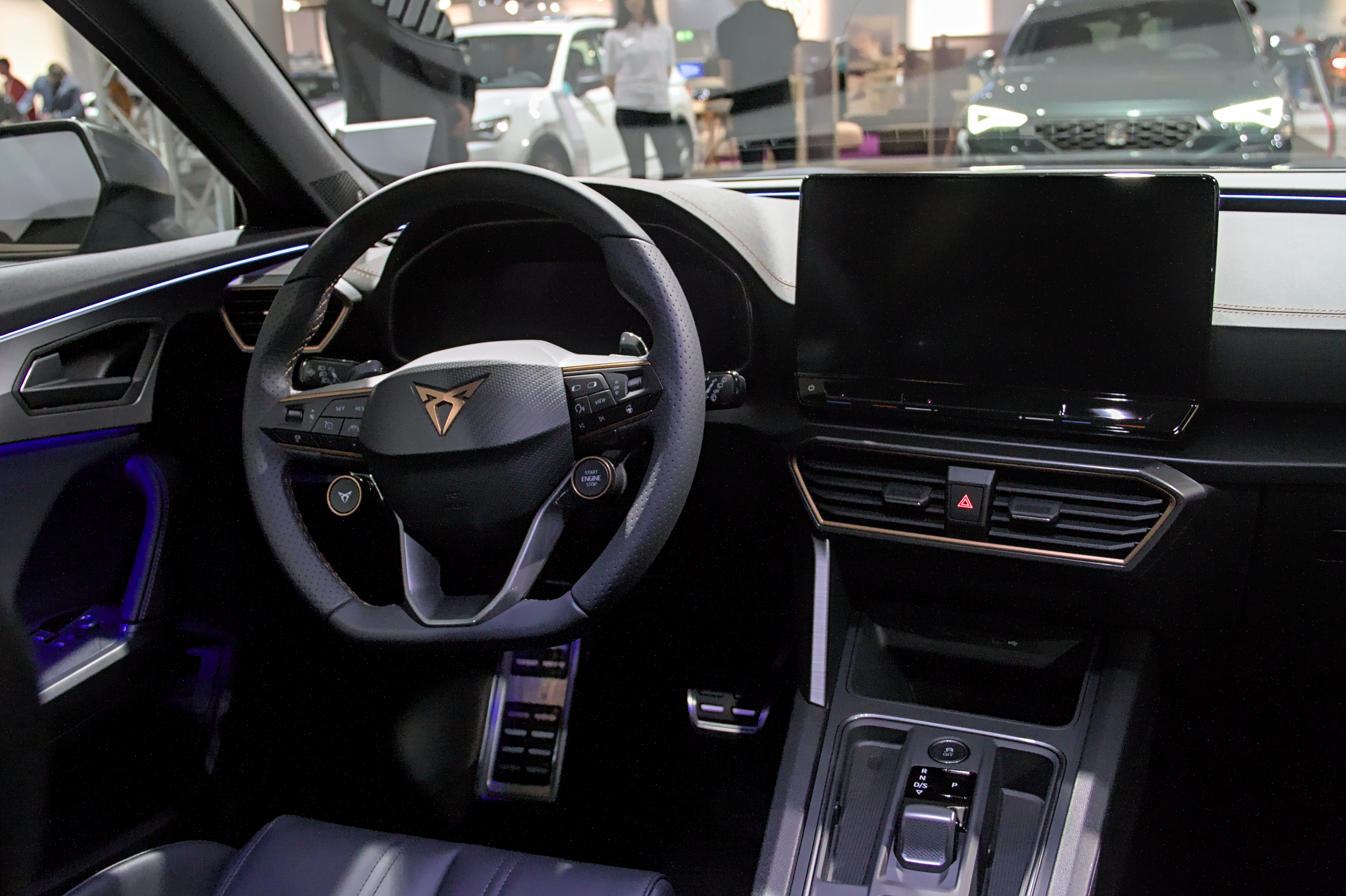
Interior

=== Facelift ===
At an event held in Spain on 7 June 2022, Cupra briefly showcased the facelift for the Formentor. It was officially revealed in April 2024. Changes includes a restyled front fascia with new LED headlight signature using three triangular elements, the rear fascia is also restyled with new full-width LED taillights using triangular elements, illuminated Cupra logo and updated bumper design, and alloy wheel designs. Inside, there is a larger touchscreen infotainment system at 12.9-inch with new software, the slider controls placed below the touchscreen used to control the air-con and audio volume became illuminated, and a new sound system by Sennheiser replacing Beats. Other changes include for the Plug In version a larger battery with nearly 20kWh of useable storage and an increase of the maximum available power for the PHEV from 245 to 272 PS.

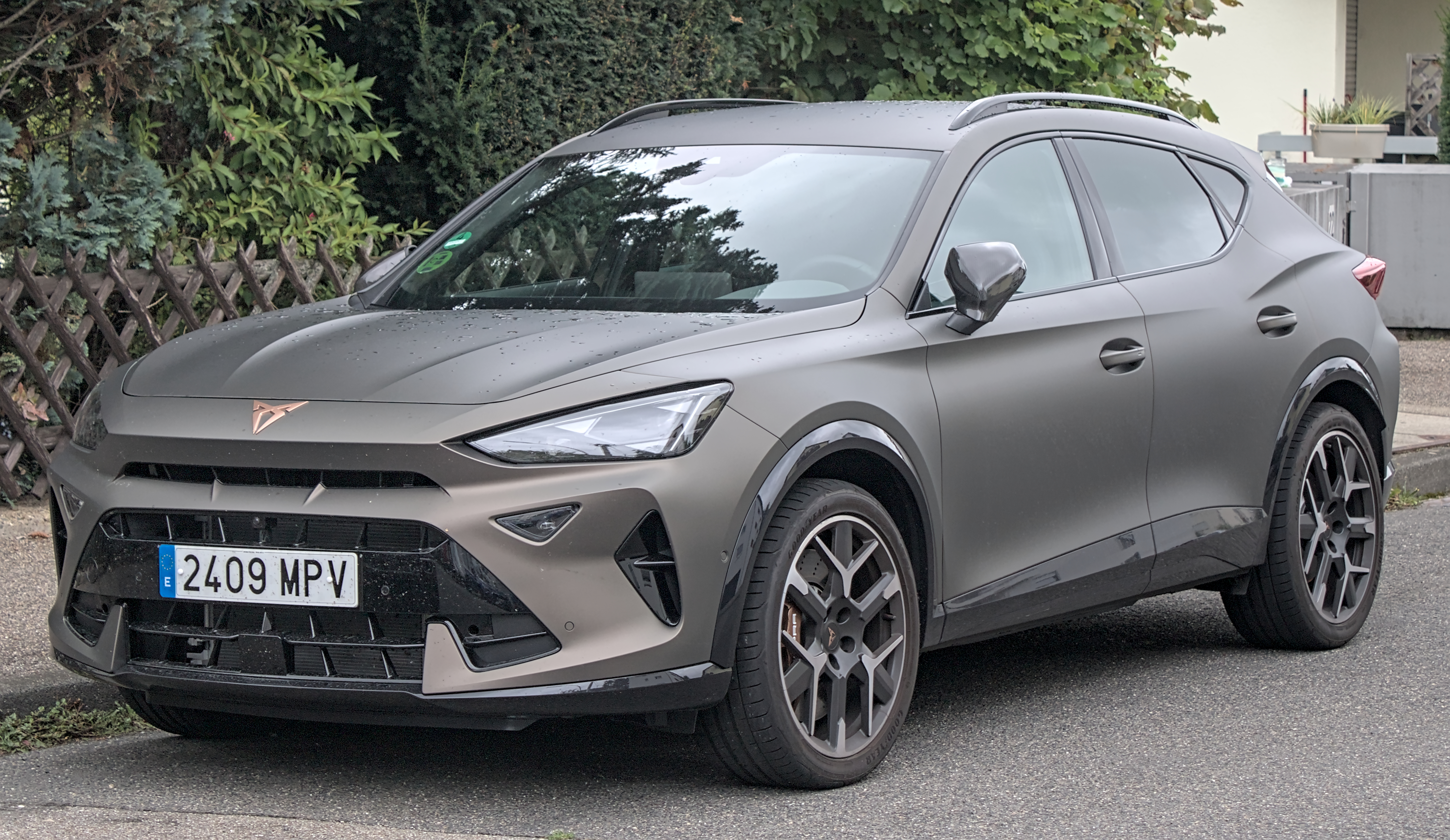
Cupra Formentor (facelift)

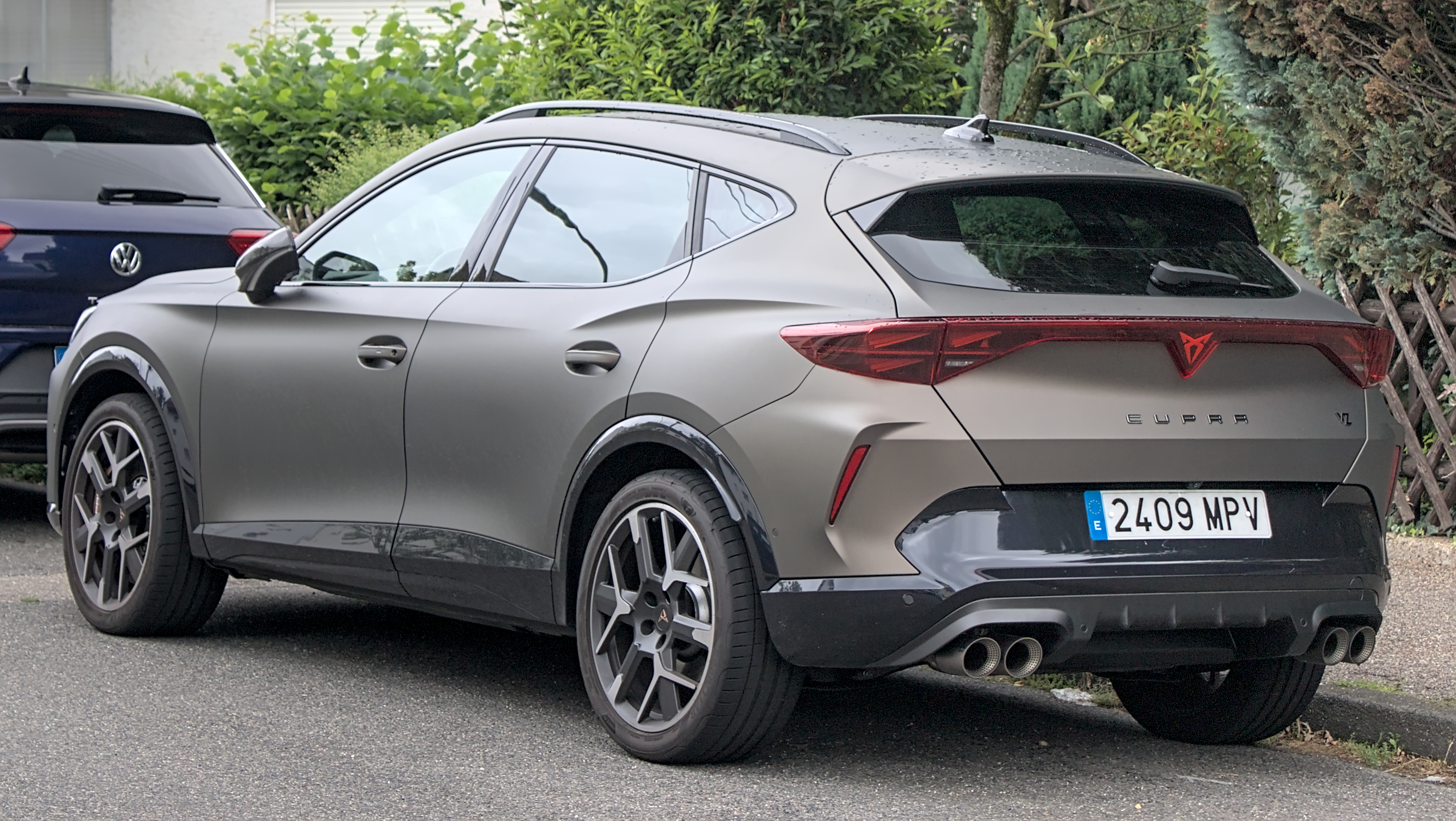
Rear view

=== Safety ===
==== ANCAP ====
ANCAP test results Cupra Formentor (2021, aligned with Euro NCAP)
Test	Points	%
Overall:	5 /5 stars	
Adult occupant:	35.56	93%
Child occupant:	41.61	88%
Pedestrian:	36.95	68%
Safety assist:	12.83	80%

ANCAP test results Cupra Formentor (2025, aligned with Euro NCAP)
Test	Points	%
Overall:	5 /5 stars	
Adult occupant:	35.56	91%
Child occupant:	42.23	86%
Pedestrian:	50.21	79%
Safety assist:	14.36	79%

==== Euro NCAP ====
Euro NCAP test results Cupra Formentor 1.5 petrol (LHD) (2021)
Test	Points	%
Overall:	5 /5 stars	
Adult occupant:	35.6	93%
Child occupant:	43.6	88%
Pedestrian:	36.9	68%
Safety assist:	12.8	80%

Euro NCAP test results Cupra Formentor 1.5 eTSI (LHD) (2025)
Test	Points	%
Overall:	5 /5 stars	
Adult occupant:	36.6	91%
Child occupant:	42.6	86%
Pedestrian:	50.2	79%
Safety assist:	13.9	77%

== Sales ==
Year	Europe (Note: Europe: 2020 EU 27 + UK + Switzerland + Norway + Iceland)	Turkey	Mexico	Total production
2020	5,350			11,041
2021	50,768		883	58,863
2022			2,910	101,247
2023		7,008	3,799	125,276
2024				110,438
2025				103,351
