= Alejandro Mesonero-Romanos =

Spanish car designer (born 1968)

Alejandro Mesonero-Romanos Aguilar (born in Madrid, 1968) is a Spanish car designer.

== Background ==
Alejandro Mesonero-Romanos, born in Madrid in 1968, is the son of the engineer José Luis Mesonero-Romanos Sánchez-Pol and Sonsoles Aguilar Barbadillo. He is the youngest of seven siblings and great-great-grandson of the prose writer and one of the major figures of literary costumbrismo in Spain Ramón de Mesonero Romanos (1803–1882). From an early age he became interested in the world of the automobile.

After finishing high school, he moved to Barcelona to study at the ELISAVA School of Design and Engineering, after which he worked for a year in the now-defunct Associated Designers design studio, also in Barcelona. His first work experience in the automotive field was at Carrocerías Ayats in Arbúcies, Girona, specialized in luxury coaches. Having been offered a scholarship from the English government, he moved to London to study for a master's degree in Automotive Design at the Royal College of Art.

== Career ==
In 1995, he joined SEAT's Design department in Martorell, where his brother Carlos had been working since 1985 in a time when the company's range was in the process of modernization. His involvement in the conception of the SEAT Bolero prototype, which eventually would not evolve into a series production car, made the Volkswagen Group become interested in him, so in 1996 he joined the Design Center Europe that the consortium had in Sitges. During his stay at the center, he was responsible for the exterior design of several SEAT, Volkswagen and Audi models.

In 2001, he signed with Renault and moved to Paris, where he led several design projects of the French company, such as the Laguna Coupé, and since 2007 he served as its Advanced Design director.

Between 2009 and 2011, he resided in South Korea, where he was the design director of Renault Samsung Motors. During this period, he headed the development of the SM7 Mk2 luxury saloon.

In the summer of 2011, he accepted an offer from Walter de Silva to return and replace the Belgian Luc Donckerwolke as SEAT's Design director, since in August of that same year the latter would take over as head of Advanced Design of the entire VW Group consortium. His first work at the Martorell company was the SEAT IBL, a prototype presented at the Frankfurt Motor Show in 2011, a project in which he completed a design started by Donckerwolke. The IBL was intended to set the design direction onto which the new saloon of the brand replacing the SEAT Exeo was meant to be created.

During his stay at SEAT, the SEAT Ateca, the first SUV of the Spanish brand, was designed.

In July 2020, he signed again with Renault reporting to Laurens van den Acker, EVP, Corporate Design and member of Groupe Renault's executive committee. After having been head of design for Dacia, in April 2021 he has left Renault Group to join Stellantis, where he took the position of Head of Design for Alfa Romeo.

== Designs ==
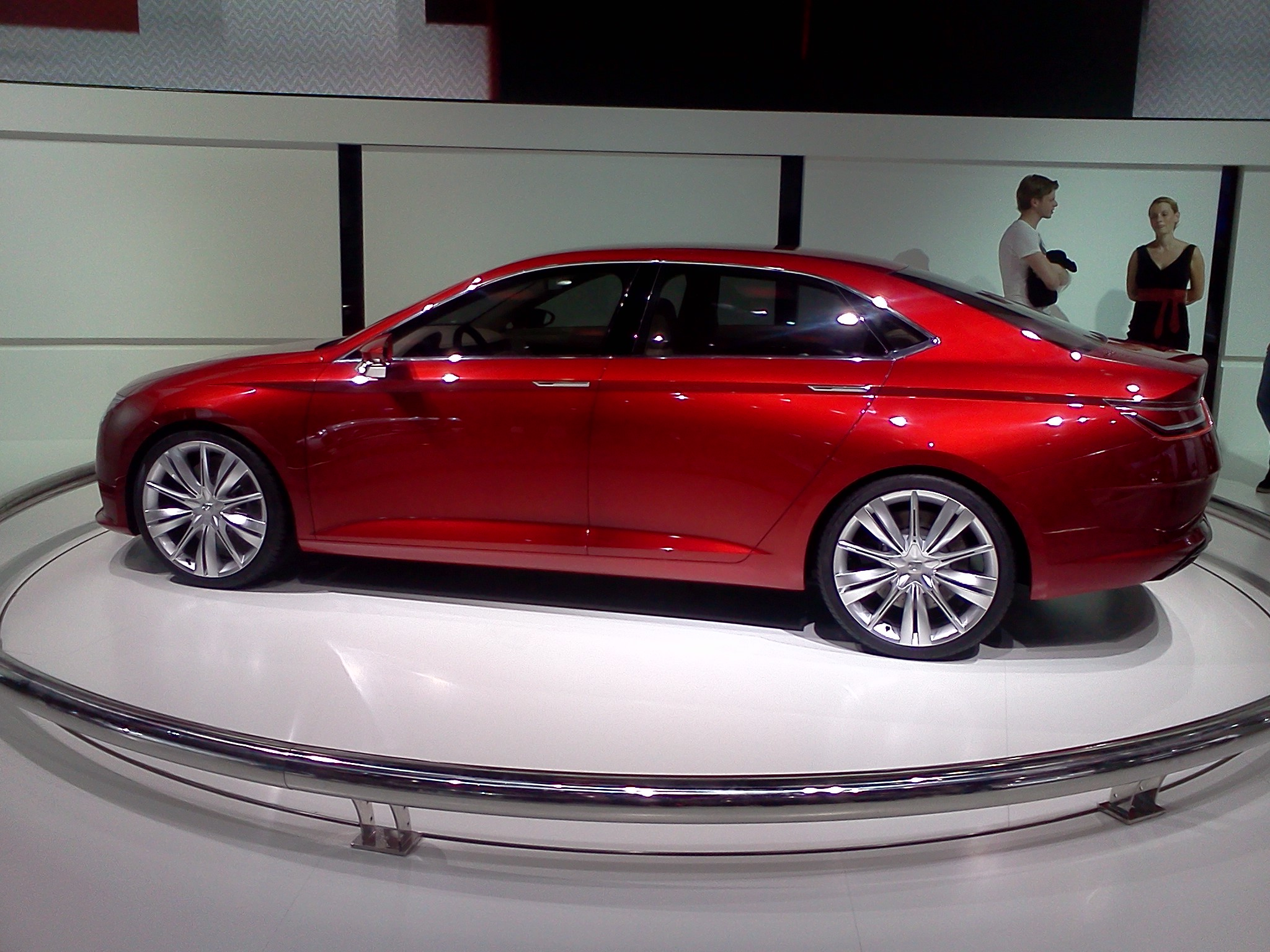
SEAT IBL

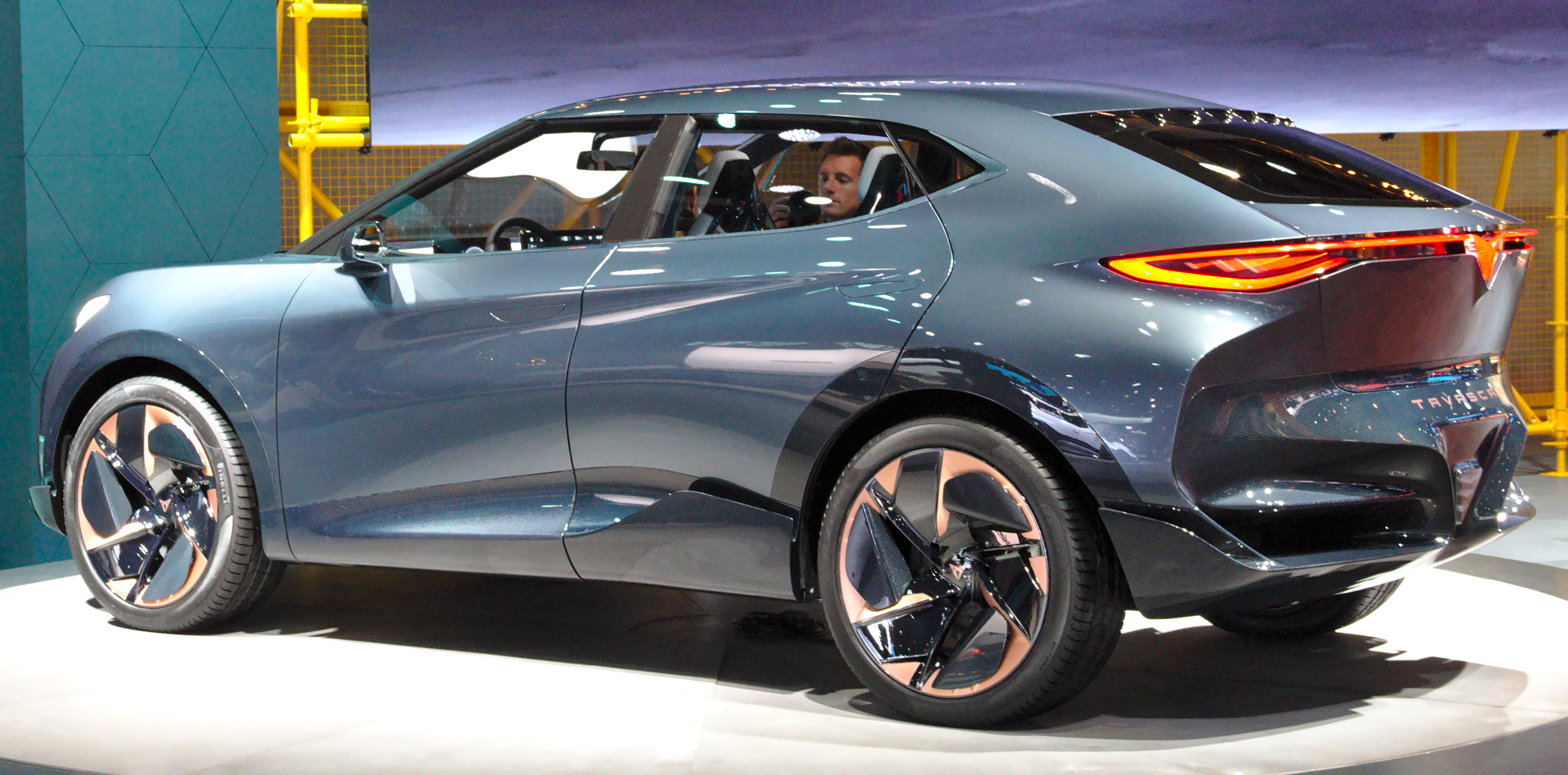
Cupra Tavascan

- Renault Laguna Coupé (2008)
- Renault Samsung SM5 Mk3 (2010)
- Renault Samsung SM7 Mk2 (2011)
- SEAT IBL (2011)
- SEAT León Mk3 (2012)
- SEAT 20V20 (2015)
- SEAT Ateca (2016)
- SEAT Ibiza Mk5 (2017)
- SEAT Arona (2017)
- SEAT Tarraco (2018)
- SEAT Minimó (2019)
- Cupra Born (2019)
- Cupra Formentor (2019)
- Cupra Tavascan (2019)
- SEAT e-Scooter (2019)
- SEAT León Mk4 (2020)
- Alfa Romeo 33 Stradale (2023)
- Alfa Romeo Junior (2024)

== Awards ==
- German Design Council Automotive Brand Contest Best Concept Car of the Year 2015 (SEAT 20V20)
- Red Dot Best Product Design Quality 2017 (SEAT Ibiza)
- Automotive News Europe Eurostars Design Award 2018
- Red Dot Best Product Design Quality 2018 (SEAT Arona)
