= List of SEAT vehicles =

SEAT produces the following vehicles, past and present, including under the performance-oriented Cupra brand.

== Current models ==
=== SEAT brand ===
Model	Calendar year introduced	Current model		Vehicle description
Model	Calendar year introduced	Introduction	Update (facelift)	Vehicle description
Hatchback
Ibiza	1984	2017	2025	B-segment hatchback based on the MQB A0 platform.
León	1999	2020	—	C-segment hatchback based on the MQB Evo platform.
Station wagon
León Sportstourer/Estate	2013	2020	—	C-segment station wagon based on the MQB A1 platform.
SUV/crossover
Arona	2017	2017	2025	B-segment crossover SUV based on the MQB A0 platform.
Ateca	2016	2016	2020	C-segment crossover SUV based on the MQB A1 platform.

=== Cupra brand ===
Model	Calendar year introduced	Current model		Vehicle description
Model	Calendar year introduced	Introduction	Update (facelift)	Vehicle description
Hatchback
Born	2021	2021	2026	Battery electric C-segment hatchback based on the Volkswagen ID.3.
León	2020	2020	2024	Performance version of the León. Previously sold as the SEAT León Cupra.
Raval	2026	2026	—	Battery electric B-segment hatchback.
Station wagon
León Sportstourer/Estate	2020	2020	2024	Performance version of the León Sportstourer/Estate. Previously sold as the SEAT León Cupra Sportstourer/Estate.
SUV/crossover
Ateca	2018	2018	2020	Performance version of the Ateca.
Formentor	2020	2020	2024	Performance compact crossover SUV (C-segment). First standalone model for Cupra.
Tavascan	2023	2023	—	Battery electric C-segment coupe SUV based on the MEB platform.
Terramar	2024	2024	—	Three-row Compact crossover SUV (C-segment). Based on the Audi Q3.

=== SEAT MÓ models ===
- eKickscooter 25 (2020–present)
- eKickscooter 65 (2020–present)
- eScooter 125 (2020–present)

== Former models ==
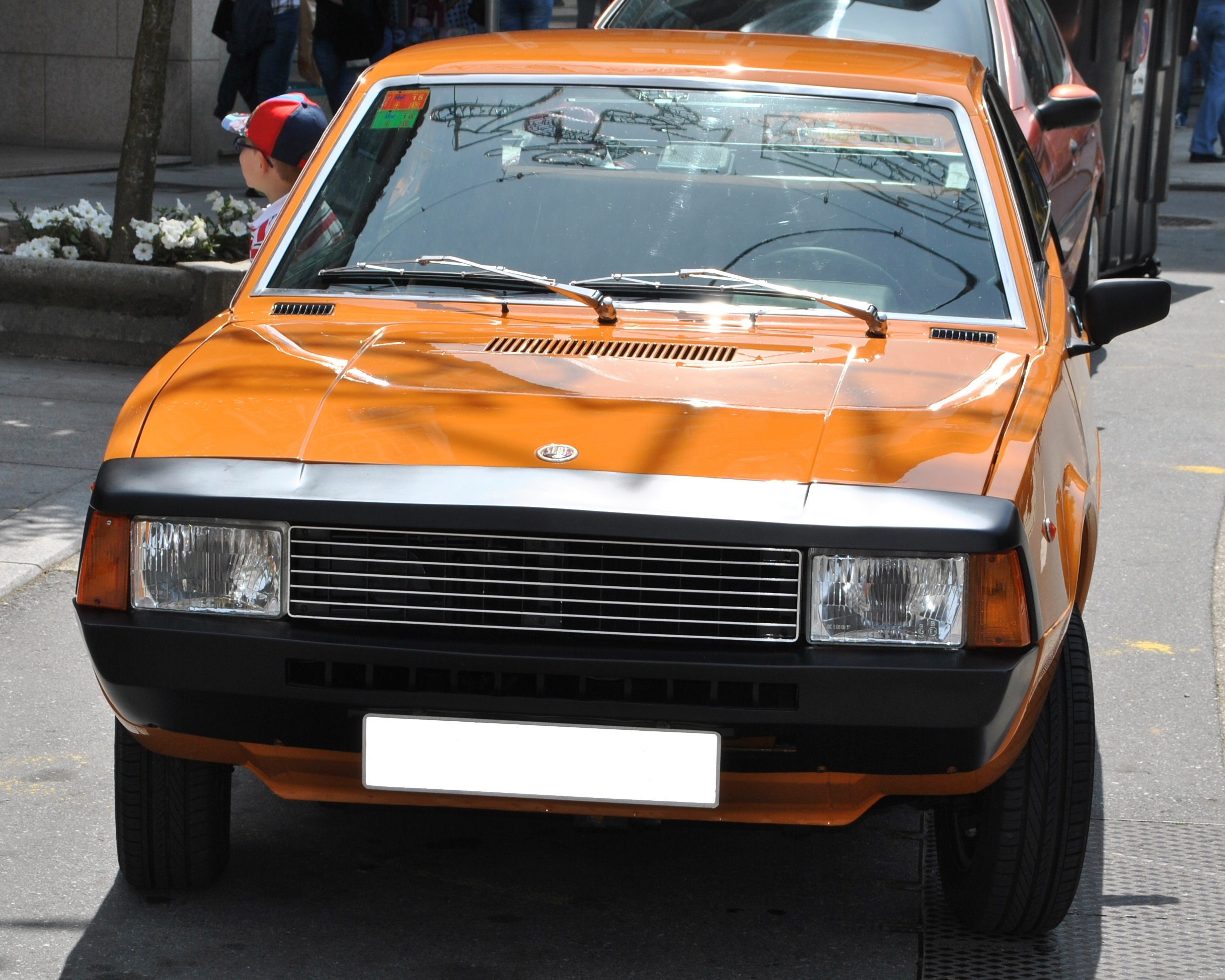
SEAT 1200 Sport, 'Bocanegra', the first car to be wholly developed in SEAT's Martorell Technical centre.

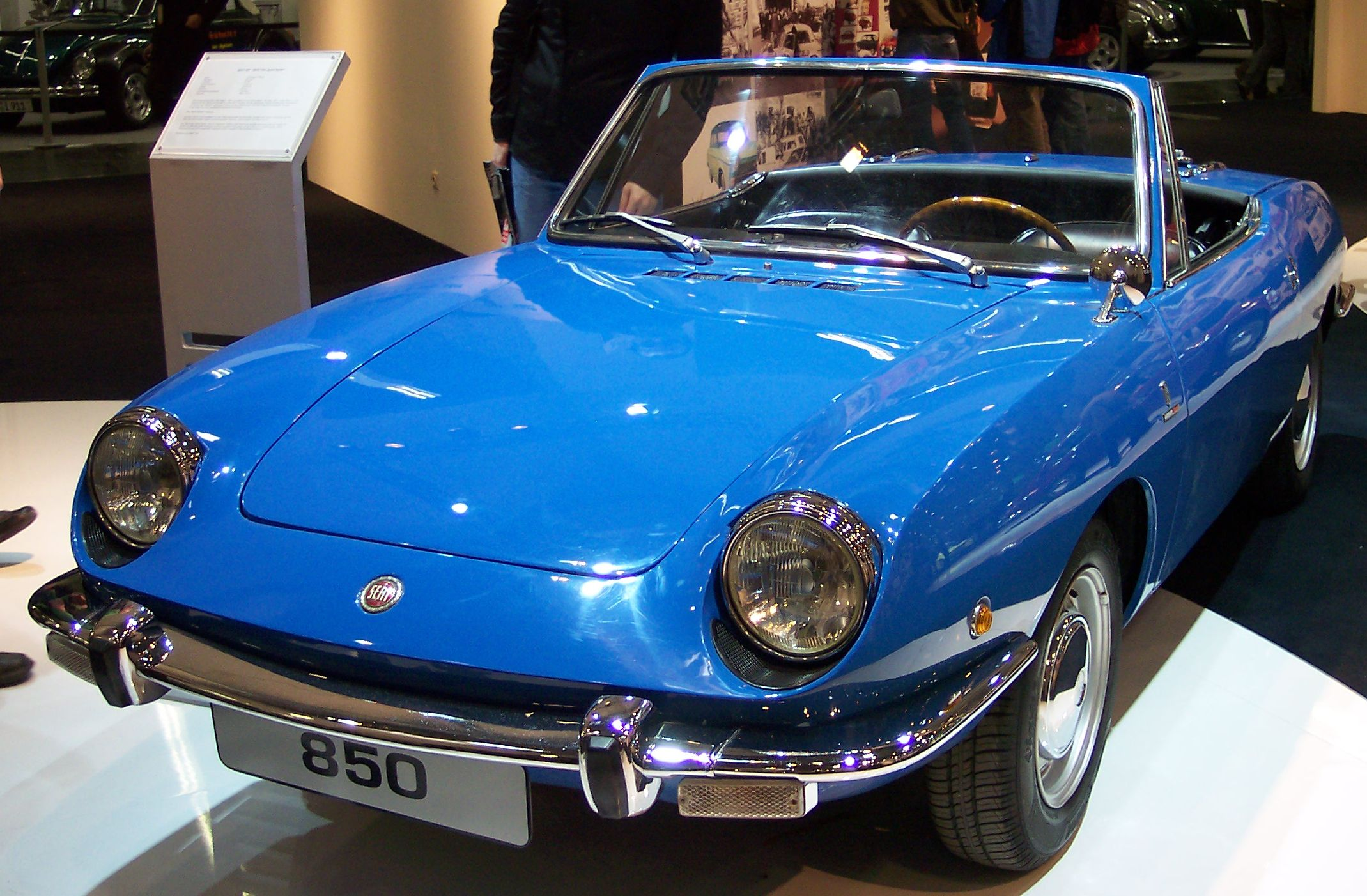
SEAT 850 Spyder, a cabriolet in SEAT's range.

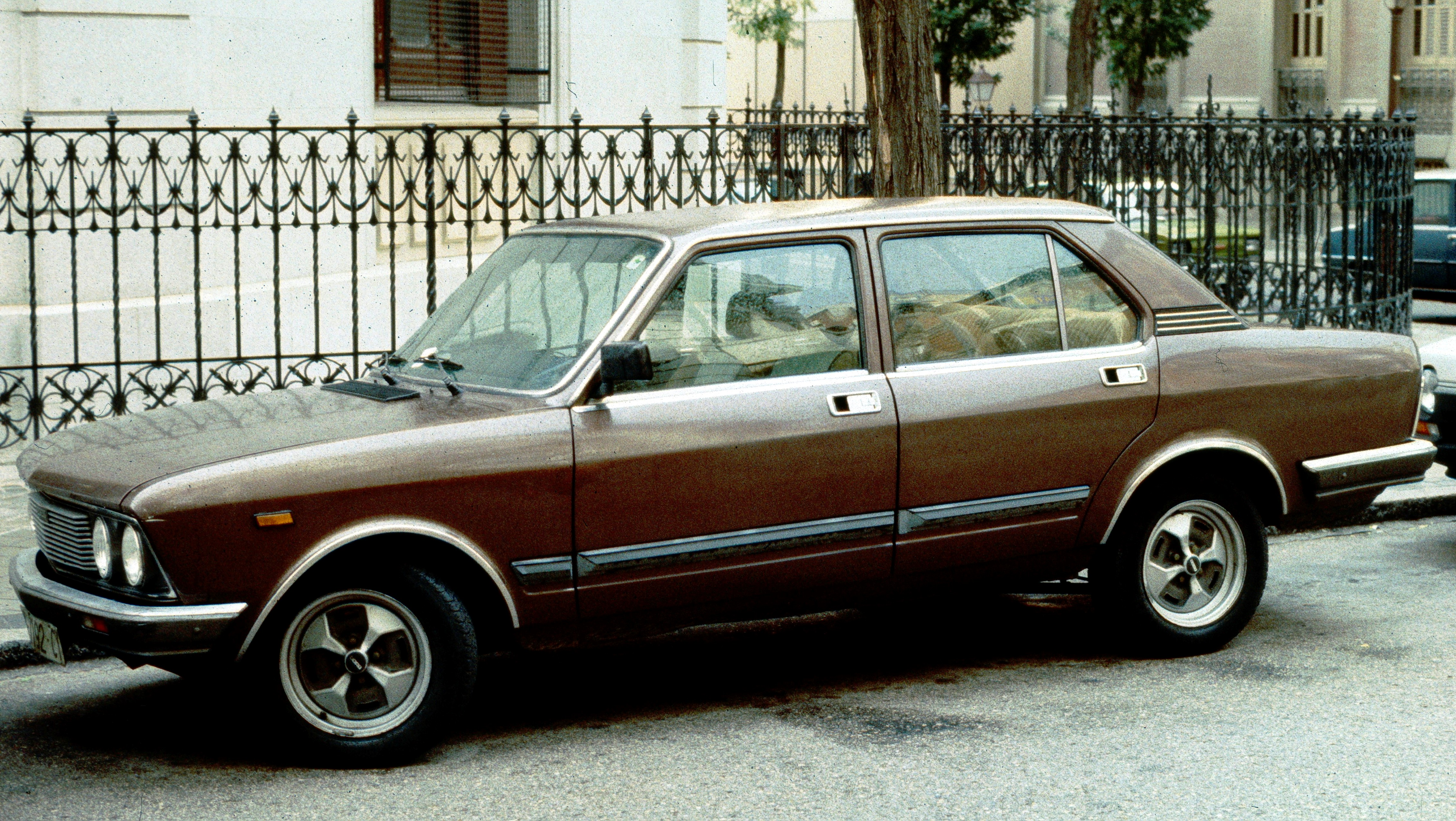
SEAT 132, the last SEAT rear wheel drive mid-size car, powered with Fiat and Mercedes-Benz diesel engines.

- 1400 A / 1400 B / 1400 C (1953–1963)
- 600 N / 600 D / 600 E / 600 L (1957–1973)
- 1500 / 1500 Familiar (1963–1972)
- 800 (1963–1968)
- 850 (2/4-doors) (1966–1974)
- 850 Coupé (1967–1972)
- 850 Spyder (1970–1972)
- 850 Sport Coupé (1967)
- 124 / 124 Familiar (1968–1980)
- 1430 (1969–1975)
- 124 Sport (1970–1975)
- 127 (1972–1982)
- 132 (1973–1982)
- 133 (1974–1981)
- 131 / 131 Familiar (1975–1983)
- 1200 Sport (1975–1981)
- 128 (1976–1980)
- Ritmo (1979–1983)
- Panda (1980–1986)
- Ronda (1982–1986)
- Trans (1982–1986)
- Fura (3/5-doors) (1982–1986)
- Ibiza Mk1 (3/5-doors) (1984–1993)
- Málaga (1985–1992)
- Terra / Terra box (1987–1996)
- Marbella / Marbella box (1986–1998)
- Toledo Mk1 (1991–1998)
- Ibiza Mk2 (3/5-doors) (1993–2002)
- Córdoba / Córdoba SX / Córdoba Vario Mk1 (1993–2002)
- Inca Kombi / Inca Van (1995–2003)
- Alhambra Mk1 (1996–2010)
- Arosa (1997–2004)
- Toledo Mk2 (1998–2004)
- León Mk1 (1999–2005)
- Ibiza Mk3 (3/5-doors) (2002–2008)
- Córdoba Mk2 (2002–2009)
- Toledo Mk3 (2004–2009)
- Altea (2004–2015)
- León Mk2 (2005–2012)
- Exeo (2008–2013)
- Ibiza Mk4 (3/5-doors) (2008–2017)
- Alhambra Mk2 (2010–2020)
- Mii (2011–2021)
- Toledo Mk4 (2012–2019)
- León Mk3 (2012–2020)
- Tarraco (2018–2024)

=== Concept models ===
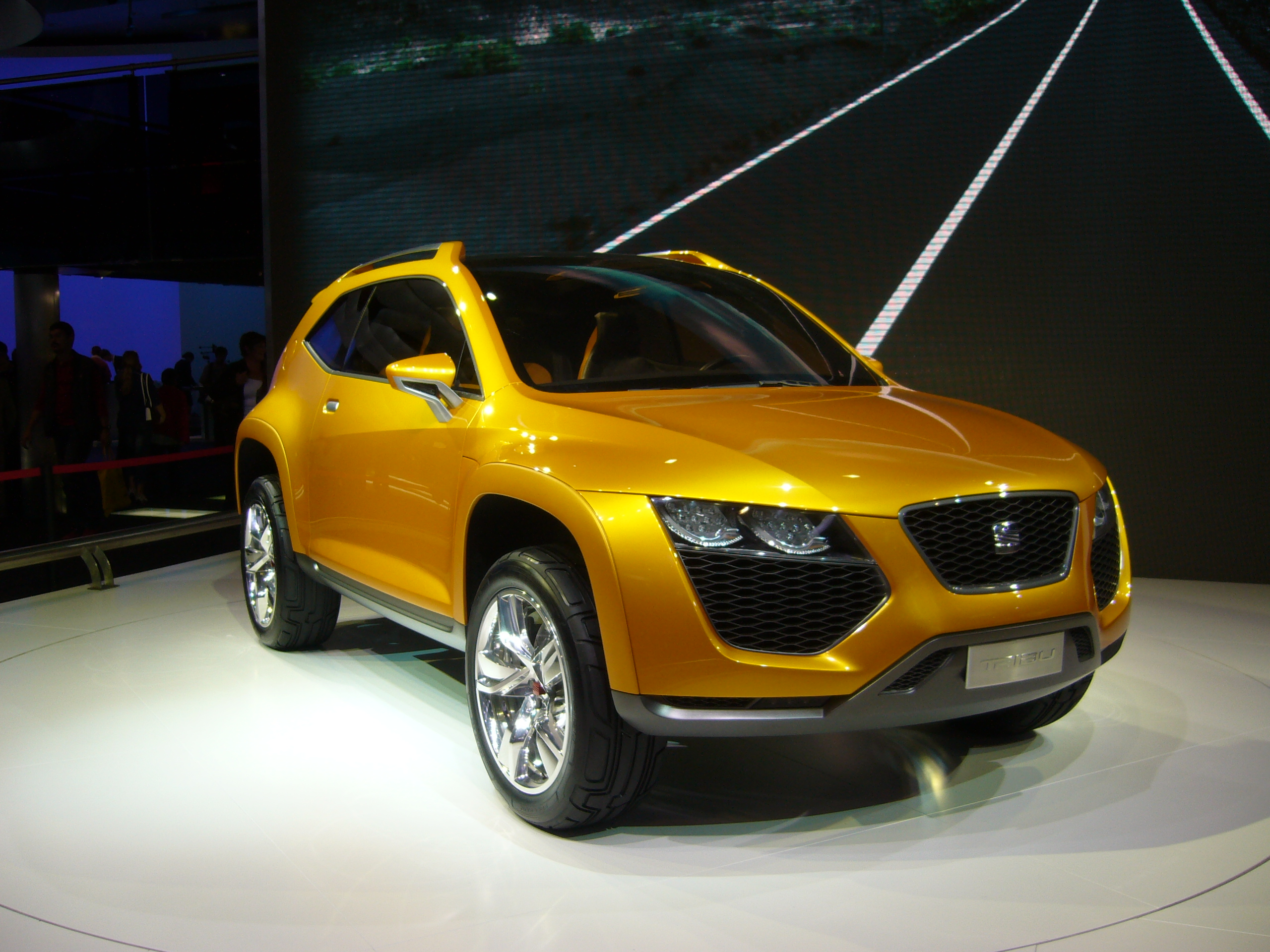
SEAT Tribu, SEAT's crossover SUV concept car.

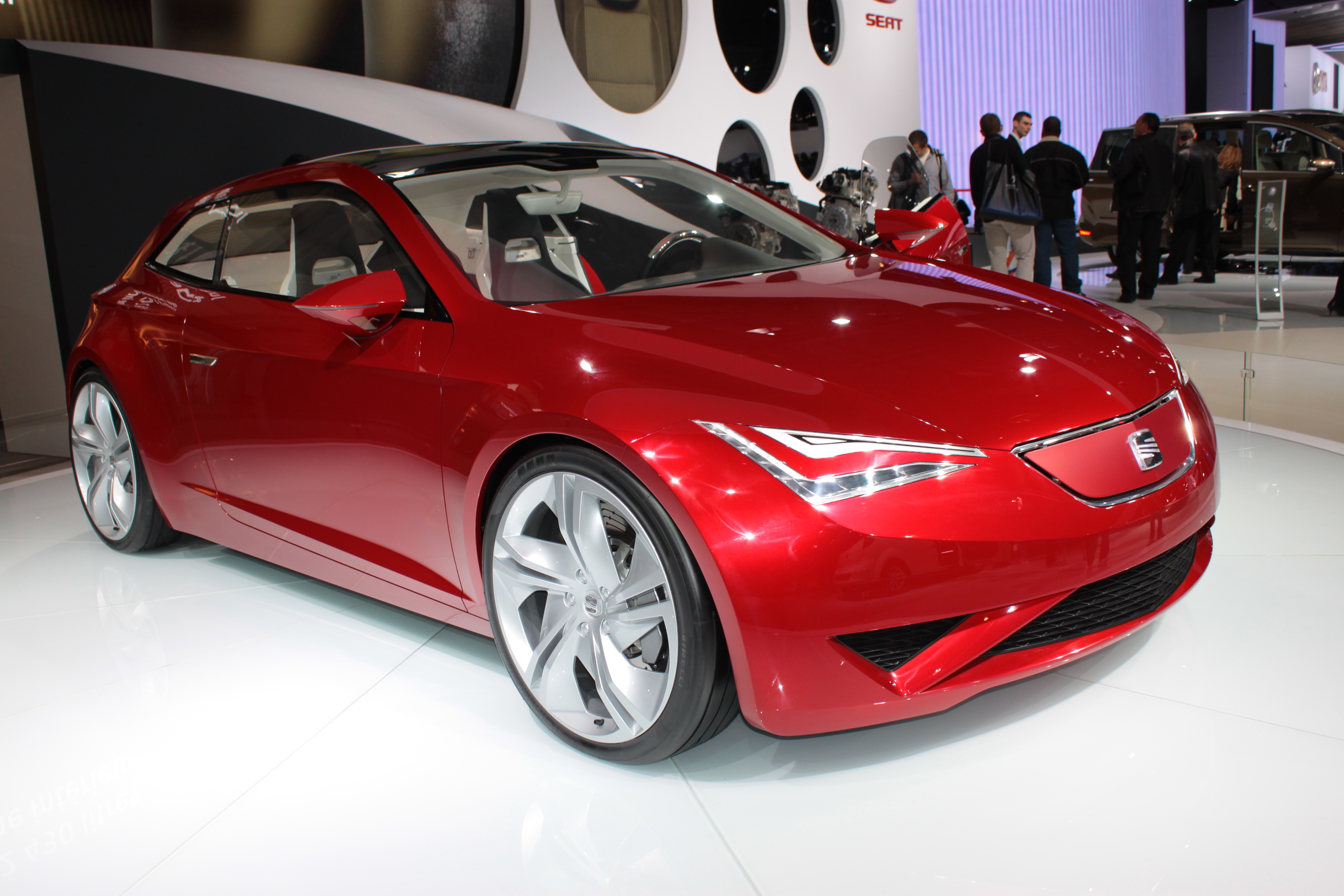
SEAT IBE concept, SEAT's first all-electric concept car.

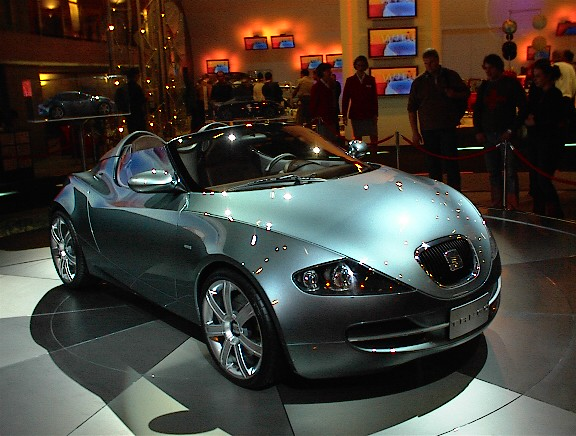
SEAT Tango, SEAT's roadster concept car.

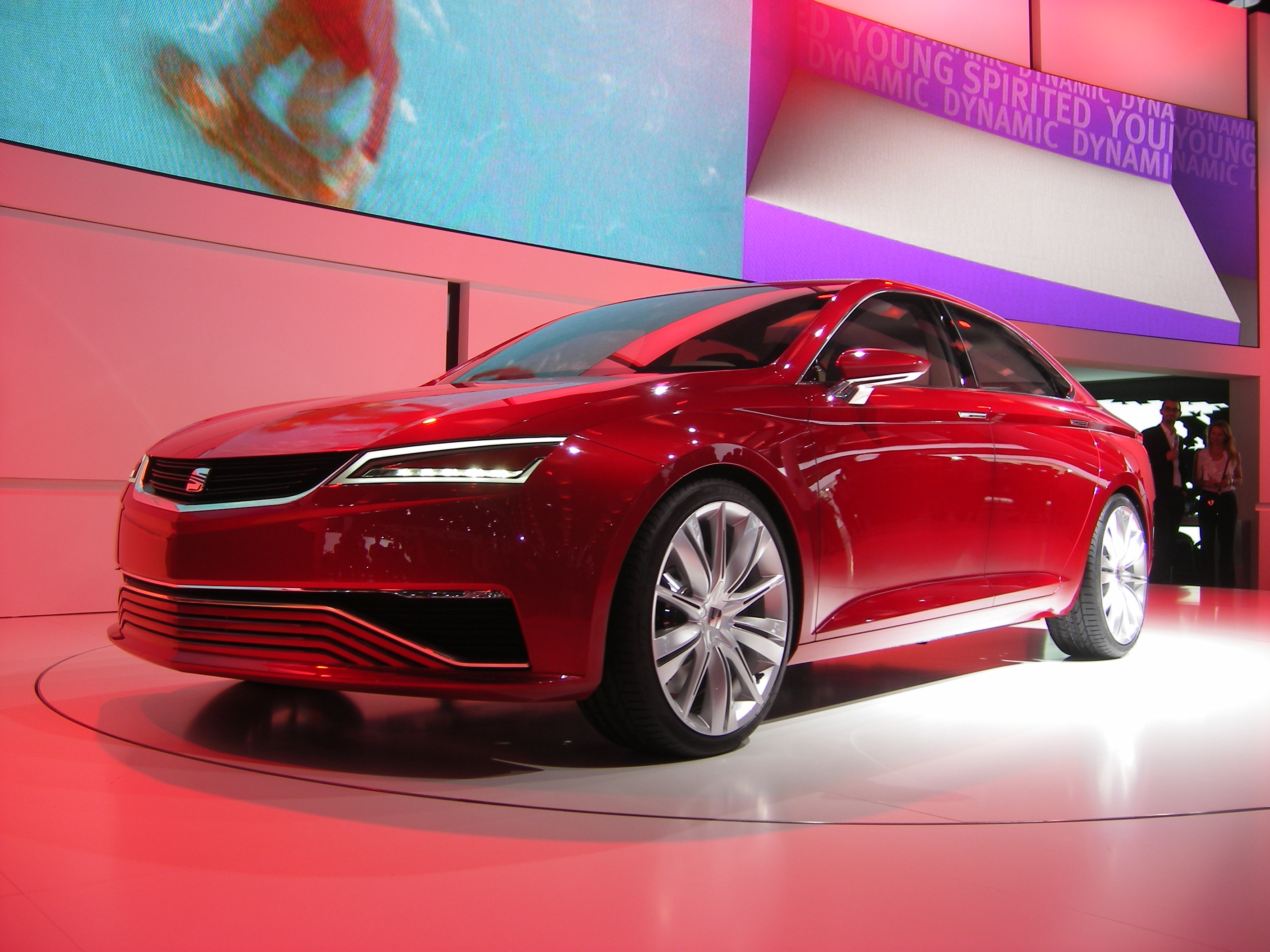
SEAT IBL at the 2011 Frankfurt International Motor Show.

- 1400 A Descapotable
- 600 prototype (Geneva, 1955)
- 750 Sport (Barcelona, 1957)
- 600 Multiple (Barcelona, 1959)
- Ibiza Mk1 cabrio
- Proto TLD (Turin, 1988)
- Proto T (Frankfurt, 1989)
- Proto C (Paris, 1990)
- Proto TL (Geneva, 1990)
- Marbella Playa (Frankfurt, 1991)
- Toledo Mk1 exclusive (Geneva,1992)
- Toledo Mk1 electric (1992)
- Concepto T coupé (Paris, 1992)
- Concepto T cabrio (Barcelona, 1993)
- Ibiza Mk2 electric (1993)
- Córdoba Mk2 cabrio
- Rosé (1994)
- Inca electric (Hanover, 1995)
- Alhambra prototype (Geneva, 1995)
- Bolero (Geneva, 1998)
- Toledo Cupra concept (1999)
- Fórmula (Geneva, 1999)
- Salsa (Geneva, 2000)
- Salsa Emoción (Paris, 2000)
- León Cupra R concept (Barcelona, 2001)
- Tango roadster/Tango spyder/Tango coupé/Tango Racer (Frankfurt, 2001)
- Arosa City cruiser (Frankfurt, 2001)
- Arosa Racer (Frankfurt, 2001)
- Altea Prototipo (Frankfurt, 2003)
- Cupra GT (Barcelona, 2003)
- Toledo Prototipo (Madrid, 2004)
- León Prototipo (Geneva, 2005)
- Altea FR Prototipo (Frankfurt, 2005)
- Altea 2 litre 170 hp TDI prototype (2005)
- Ibiza Vaillante concept (Geneva, 2006)
- León Pies Descalzos (Berlin, 2007)
- Altea Freetrack Prototipo (Geneva, 2007)
- Tribu concept (Frankfurt, 2007)
- Bocanegra (Geneva, 2008)
- León Ecomotive concept (Geneva, 2009)
- León Twin drive (Martorell, 2009)
- IBZ concept (Frankfurt, 2009)
- IBE concept I (Geneva, 2010)
- IBE concept II (Paris, 2010)
- IBX concept (Geneva, 2011)
- IBL concept (Frankfurt, 2011)
- Altea Electric XL Ecomotive (2011)
- Toledo concept (Geneva, 2012)
- SEAT Mii FR Line (Wörthersee, 2012) and (París, 2012)
- SEAT Ibiza FR Dashboard (Wörthersee, 2012)
- SEAT e-Mii (Barcelona, 2013)
- SEAT León verde plug-in (Martorell, 2013)
- SEAT Ibiza Cupster (Wörthersee, 2014)
- 20V20 (Geneva, 2015)
- el-Born (Geneva, 2019)
- Minimo (Barcelona, 2019)
