= Tribu =

Tribu may refer to:

- Tribu, a ceremonial bell in Tibetan Buddhism
- La Tribu, a Canadian independent record label founded in 1999 in Quebec
- Tribu (film), a 2007 Filipino crime drama film
- SEAT Tribu, a compact SUV concept car built by SEAT
