= Automobile Barcelona =

Autoshow in Barcelona, Catalonia (Spain)

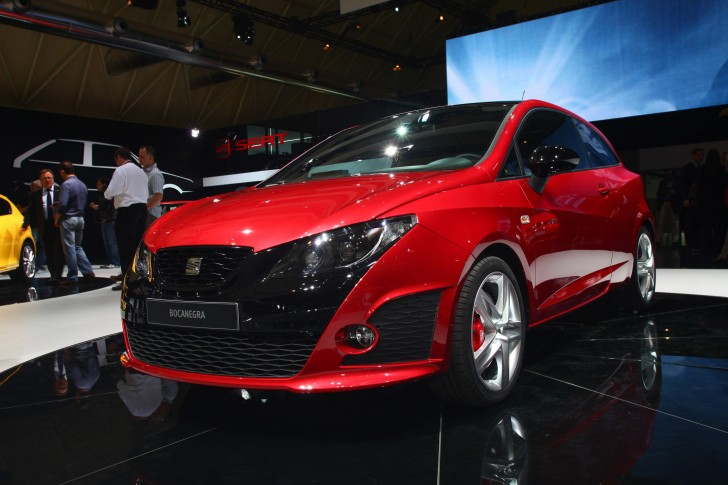
- Seat Ibiza Bocanegra at Barcelona Motor Show 2009
- Status: Active
- Venue: Fira de Barcelona's Montjuïc Exhibition Centre
- Locations: Barcelona, Catalonia
- Country: Spain
- Inaugurated: 1919
- Most recent: 2023
- Website: www.automobilebarcelona.com

The Automobile Barcelona is an auto show held every second year at Fira de Barcelona's Montjuïc Exhibition Centre in the city of Barcelona, Catalonia (Spain). Established in 1919, the Automobile Barcelona is one of the biggest trade fairs held at Barcelona’s Fira exhibition site and one of the most important fairs in Spain for both the number of visitors and participating brands. The show is scheduled in May (odd-numbered years) by the Organisation Internationale des Constructeurs d'Automobiles (OICA).

== 2013 ==
The 2013 show opened on 11 May. The show had two international debuts and four European launches.

- Renault Twizy F1
- Volkswagen e-up

== 2011 ==
The 2011 show ran from 14–22 May.

- Hyundai i40 Sedan
- Volkswagen Scirocco "Limited Edition"

== 2009 ==
- Audi Q3 Concept
- Abarth 695 Tributo Ferrari
- Dacia Sandero Stepway
- Fiat 500 TwinAir
- Ford Focus Latvala
- Nissan NV200 Van
- Mercedes-Benz Viano "Ice Age"
- Opel Insignia OPC
- Seat Exeo ST
- Seat Ibiza "25th Anniversary"
- Seat Ibiza Bocanegra
- Seat Ibiza FR
- Seat Leon Cupra (facelift)
- Skoda Fabia Sportline
- Skoda Roomster Orbea

== 2007 ==
- Citroën C4 Pallas
- Ford Focus WRC-S Edition
- Kia Picanto
- Opel Corsa GSi
- Peugeot 207 SW
- Seat Altea Freetrack
- Mazel SRX
- Sunred SR08 Prototype

== 2005 ==
Dates: from the 7th until 15 May

- Nissan Navara King Cab
- Seat Leon
- Suzuki Swift Super 1600
- Fiat Sportiva Latina Concept

== 2003 ==
- Renault Megane Classic
- Renault Megane Grandtour
- Renault Kangoo 4x4
- Lancia Granturismo Stilnovo Concept
- Jaguar XF10 Concept (Fuore)
- Seat Cupra GT Concept
- Seat León Cupra R

== 2001 ==
- Nissan Primera
- Seat Leon Cupra R Concept

== 1999 ==
- Seat Ibiza 3-door
- Seat Ibiza 5-door
- Suzuki Jimny Canvas Top

== 1997 ==
- Fiat Marea
- Renault Kangoo
- SEAT Córdoba Vario

== 1993 ==
- SEAT Concepto T Cabrio
- Seat Ibiza 3-door

== 1991 ==
- Audi S4 (C4)
- Seat Toledo

== 1989 ==
- Pegaso Solo 500 (concept)

== 1987 ==
- Pegaso Troner

== 1975 ==
- Porsche 930 Turbo (3.0-liter)
- SEAT 131

== 1974 ==
- Alfa Romeo 2000 Spider Veloce Aerodinamica
- SEAT 133

== 1973 ==
- SEAT 132

== 1970 ==
- Seat 124 Sport

== 1967 ==
- Lamborghini 400GT Monza
- Artes Campeador
- Hispakart GT

== 1955 ==
- Pegaso Z-207 Prototype
