= SEAT Ateca =

Compact crossover vehicle (CUV) manufactured by SEAT

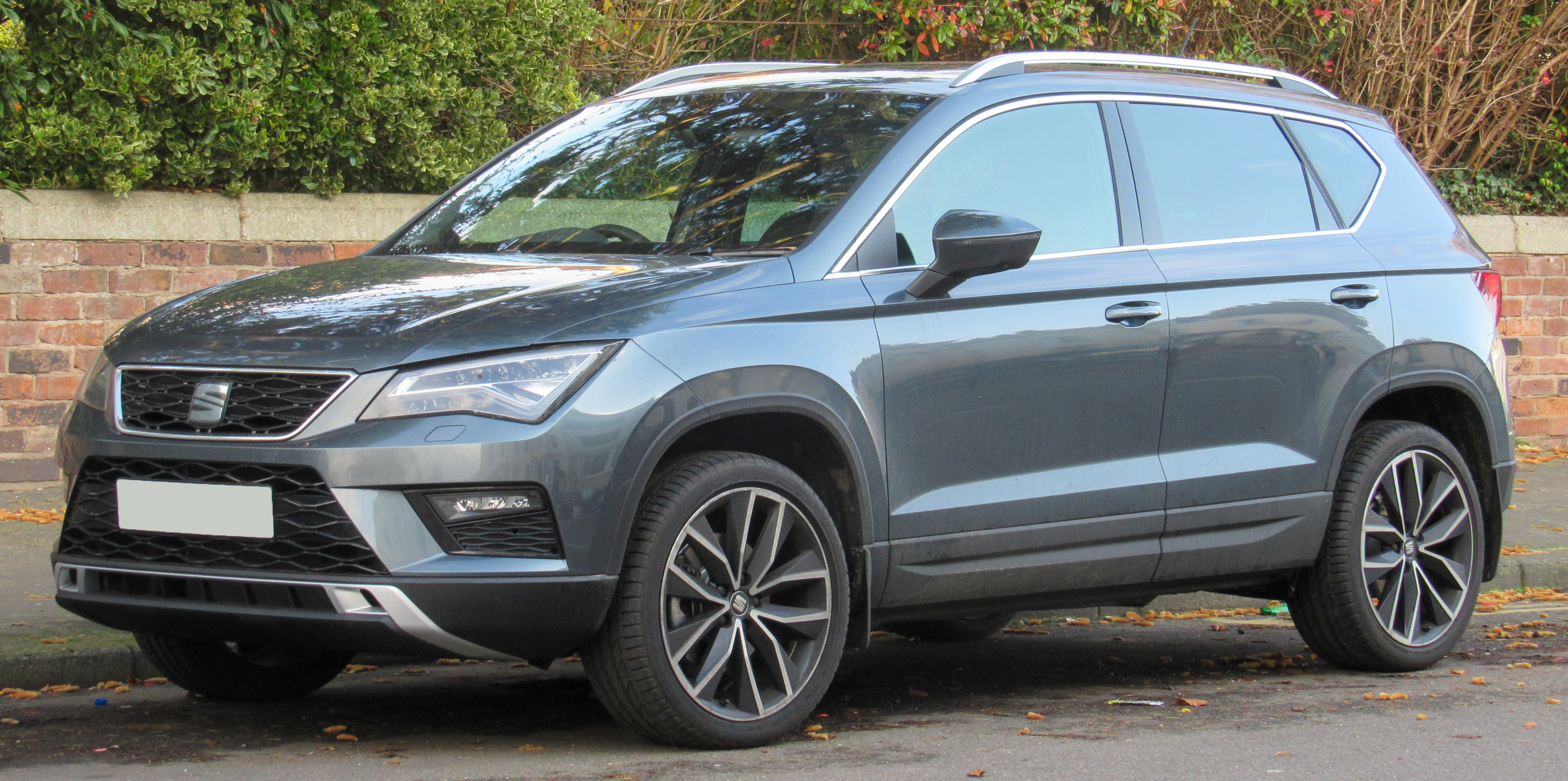
- Pre-facelift SEAT Ateca

Overview
- Manufacturer: SEAT
- Model code: KH7
- Also called: Cupra Ateca
- Production: 2016–2026
- Assembly: Czech Republic: Kvasiny; Algeria: Relizane; Iran: Bam (RVMCO)
- Designer: Xavier Guinart under Alejandro Mesonero-Romanos

Body and chassis
- Class: Compact crossover SUV (C)
- Body style: 5-door SUV
- Layout: Front-engine, front-wheel drive or all-wheel drive
- Platform: Volkswagen Group MQB A1
- Related: Audi Q2; Jetta VS5; Skoda Karoq

Powertrain
- Engine: Petrol: 1.0 L TSI 115 I3; 1.4 L TSI 150 I4; 1.5 L eTSI 150 I4; 2.0 L TSI 190 I4; 2.0 L TSI 300 I4 (Cupra Ateca); Diesel: 1.6 L TDI 115 I4; 2.0 L TDI 150 I4; 2.0 L TDI 190 I4
- Transmission: 6-speed manual; 7-speed DSG (2017 - 2020); 8-speed Automatic gearbox (2021 - present)

Dimensions
- Wheelbase: 2,638 mm (103.9 in)
- Length: 4,363–4,381 mm (171.8–172.5 in)
- Width: 1,841 mm (72.5 in)
- Height: 1,615 mm (63.6 in)

Chronology
- Predecessor: SEAT Altea
- Successor: Cupra Terramar (for Cupra Ateca)

The SEAT Ateca is a compact crossover SUV (C-segment) manufactured by Spanish automaker SEAT. The brand's first SUV offering, the Ateca is built on the Volkswagen Group MQB A1 platform and sits in the C-SUV segment, between the Arona and Tarraco within SEAT's crossover SUV lineup. It was unveiled as a production vehicle on 1 March 2016 in Barcelona.

== Overview ==
The Ateca was previewed as a concept vehicle, the SEAT IBX which was showcased at the 2011 Geneva Motor Show, followed by the SEAT 20V20 Concept at the 2015 Geneva Motor Show. The production version was released in March 2016 and it went on sale from September 2016. In keeping with SEAT's tradition of naming its cars after Spanish places, The Ateca is named after Ateca village to the west of Zaragoza, near SEAT headquarters in Barcelona.

As part of Volkswagen Group policy of making similar models with shared platforms in the same factory, the Ateca is not produced in Spain, rather it is produced at Škoda production facility in Kvasiny, Czech Republic alongside the Škoda Karoq to cut costs.

The top of the range model is the Xcellence. This model boasts leather seats, an eight-inch touchscreen, 18-inch alloy wheels and a drive setting wheel, which lets you choose from sport, normal, eco, individual, off-road and snow. Mid-range is the SE version, and the bottom of the range is the S version.

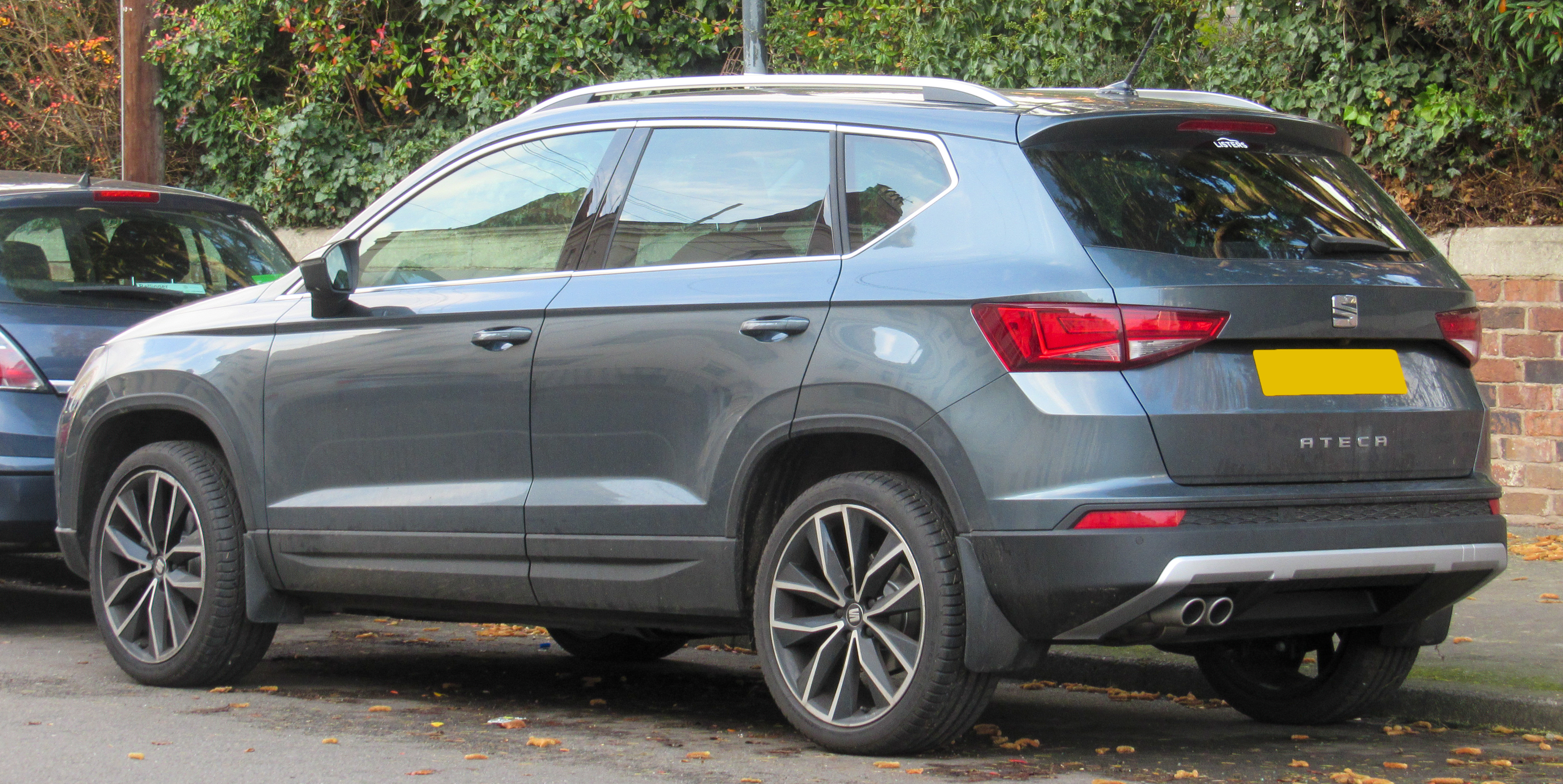
SEAT Ateca XCELLENCE (rear view)

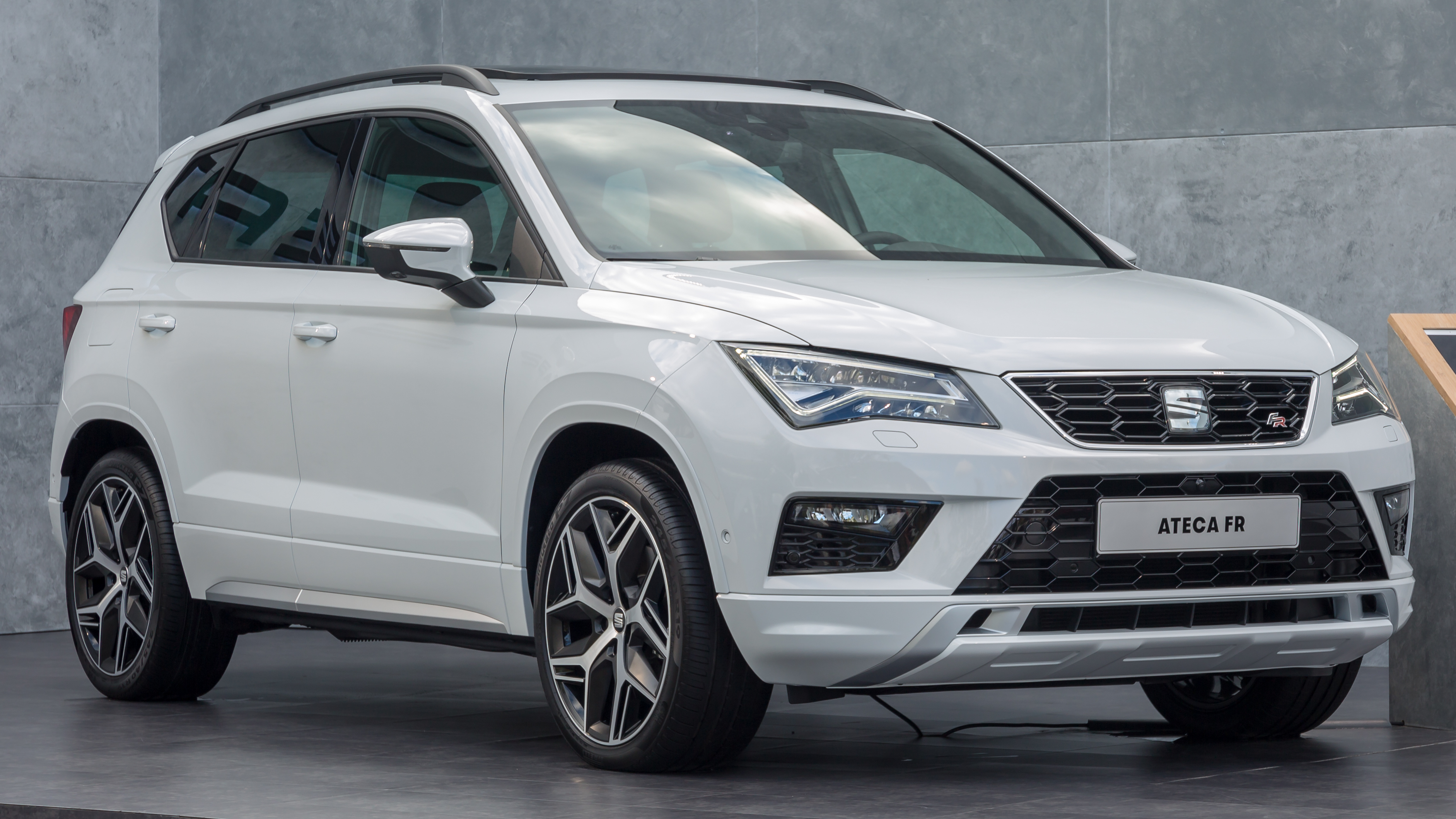
SEAT Ateca FR

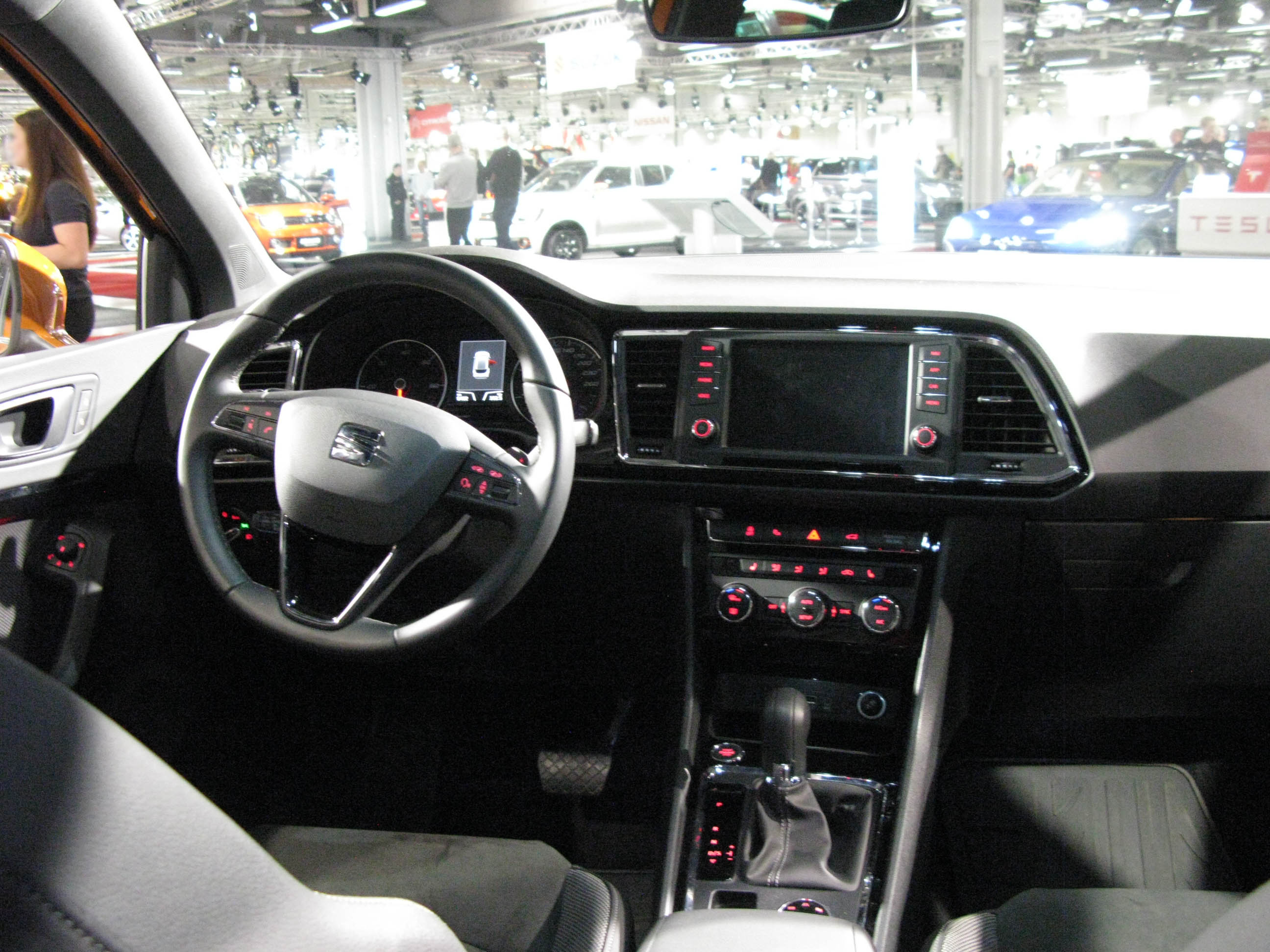
Interior

== Facelift ==
The facelifted Ateca was revealed in June 2020. Exterior revisions over the previous Ateca model include a modified front bumper, a new rear bumper, a revised radiator grille, new LED headlamps and tail lights and a pair of redesigned fog lamps. The rear lighting units share a similar design to the Tarraco and feature sequential indicators on the FR and Xperience trim-levels. The Ateca's block-capital badge design has been swapped for the same hand-written script found on the rear of the new Leon.

In the interior, the facelifted Ateca gets a new leather steering wheel, updated door cards and a choice of new upholstery designs. There's also an eight-way electrically adjustable driver's seat, a pair of new USB-C ports, a multi-colour ambient lighting system and voice recognition. The Ateca received an 8.25-inch infotainment system as standard with a larger 9.2-inch unit as an option.

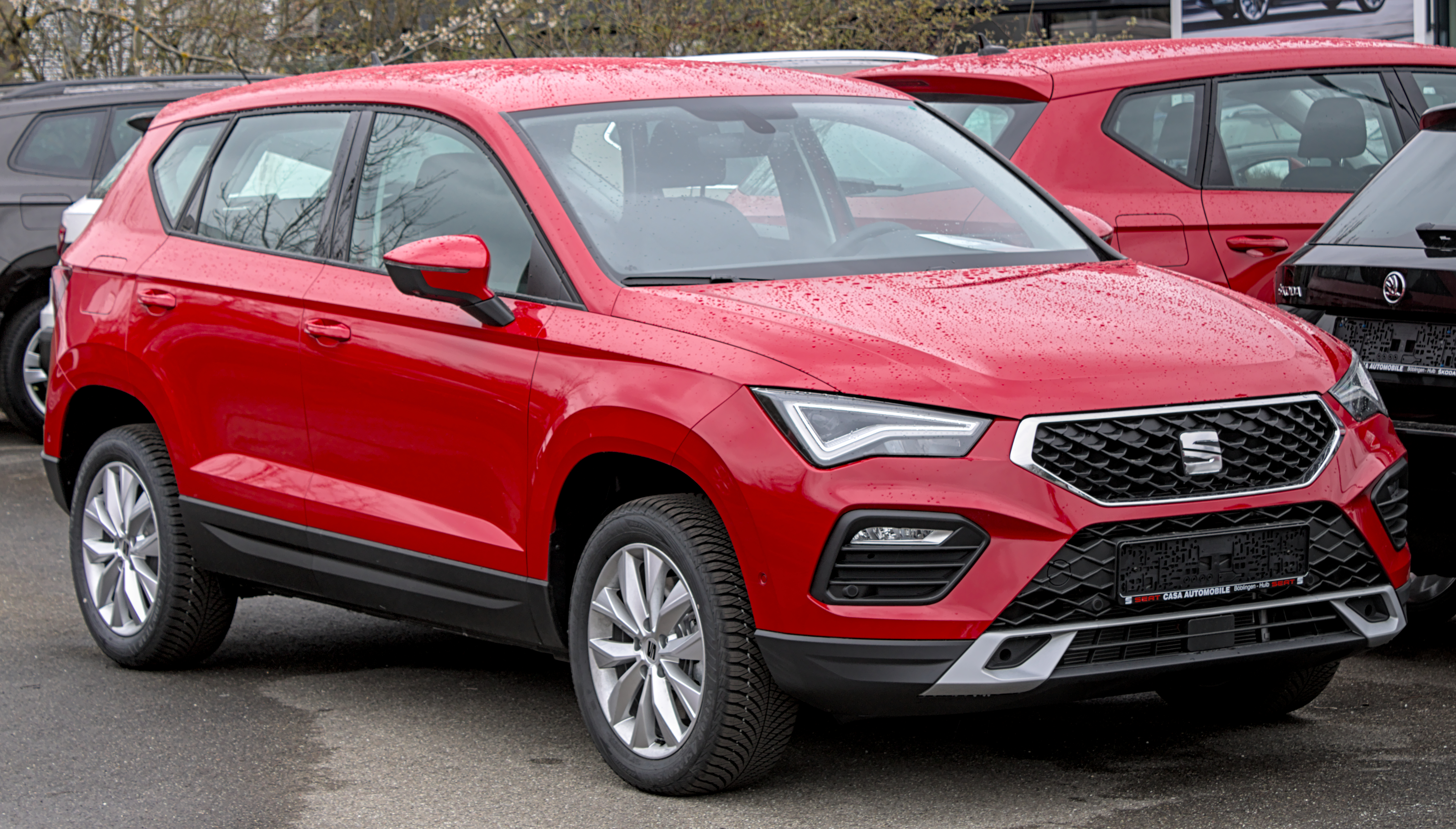
2021 SEAT Ateca (facelift)

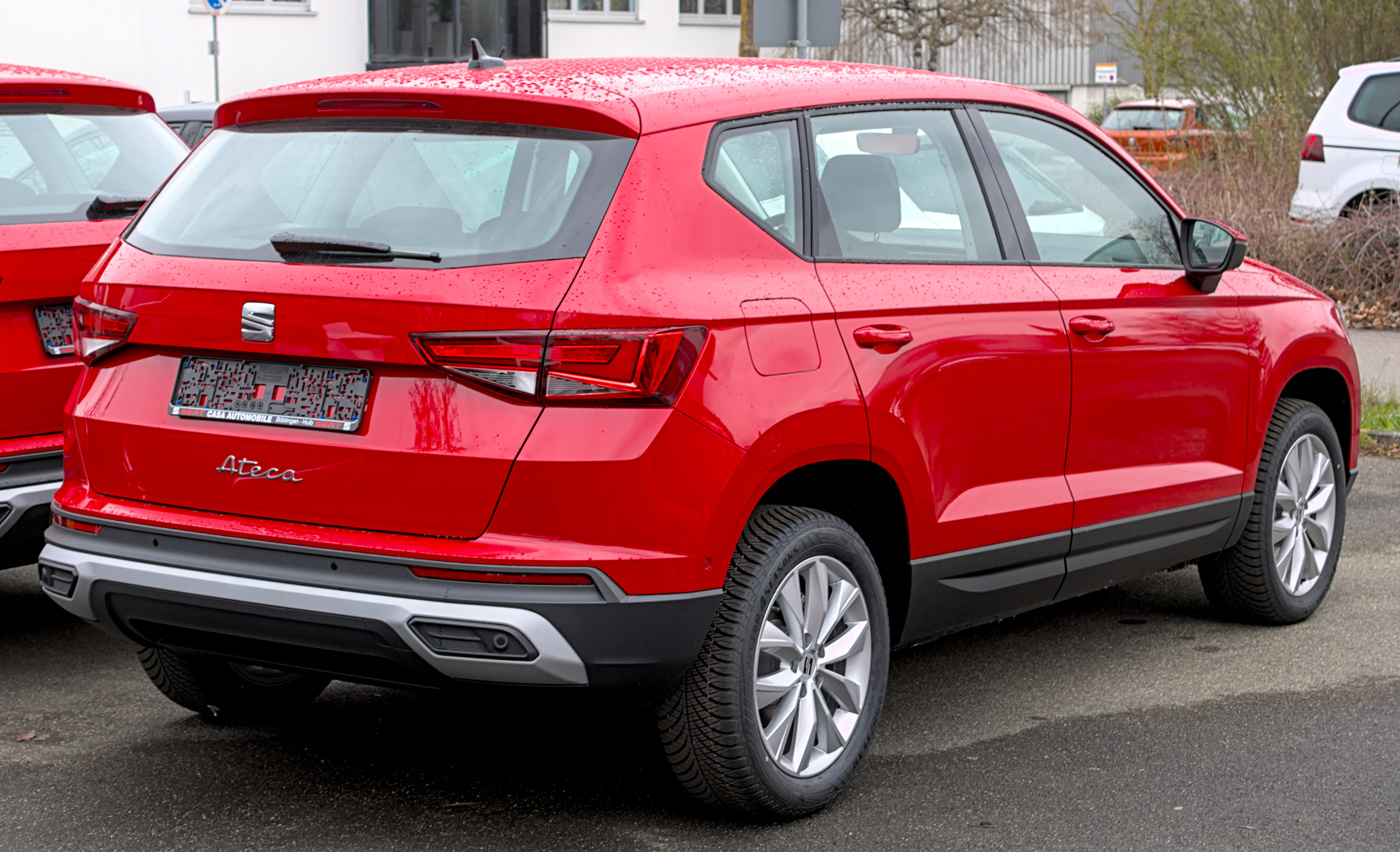
2021 SEAT Ateca (facelift)

== Cupra Ateca ==
The Ateca is also sold under a new performance-oriented brand, Cupra, whose cars are based on existing SEAT models. As a result, the car does not bear the SEAT logo in favour of the copper-tinted badge Cupra logo. It features a redesigned front and rear bumpers, quad exhaust pipes, and gloss-black detailing on several exterior elements, including the wing mirrors, side mouldings, wheels and front grille.

The Cupra Ateca gets a 2.0-litre turbocharged petrol engine producing 300 PS (221 kW; 296 hp) and paired with a 7-speed DSG dual-clutch automatic transmission, 4Drive all-wheel drive and an adaptive suspension. SEAT claims the combination can take the compact SUV from 0–100 km/h (0–62 mph) in 5.4 seconds with a top speed of 245 km/h (152 mph). The car can operate in a number of modes, including a new 'Cupra' setting that firms up the suspension and allows more engine noise through to the cabin.

As standard, every Cupra Ateca model comes equipped with 19-inch alloy wheels, black Alcantara seats, a digital instrument cluster, wireless phone charging, an eight-inch touchscreen, and dynamic chassis control. Optional kit includes a Beats audio sound system, 20-inch wheels, a panoramic roof and tow bar.

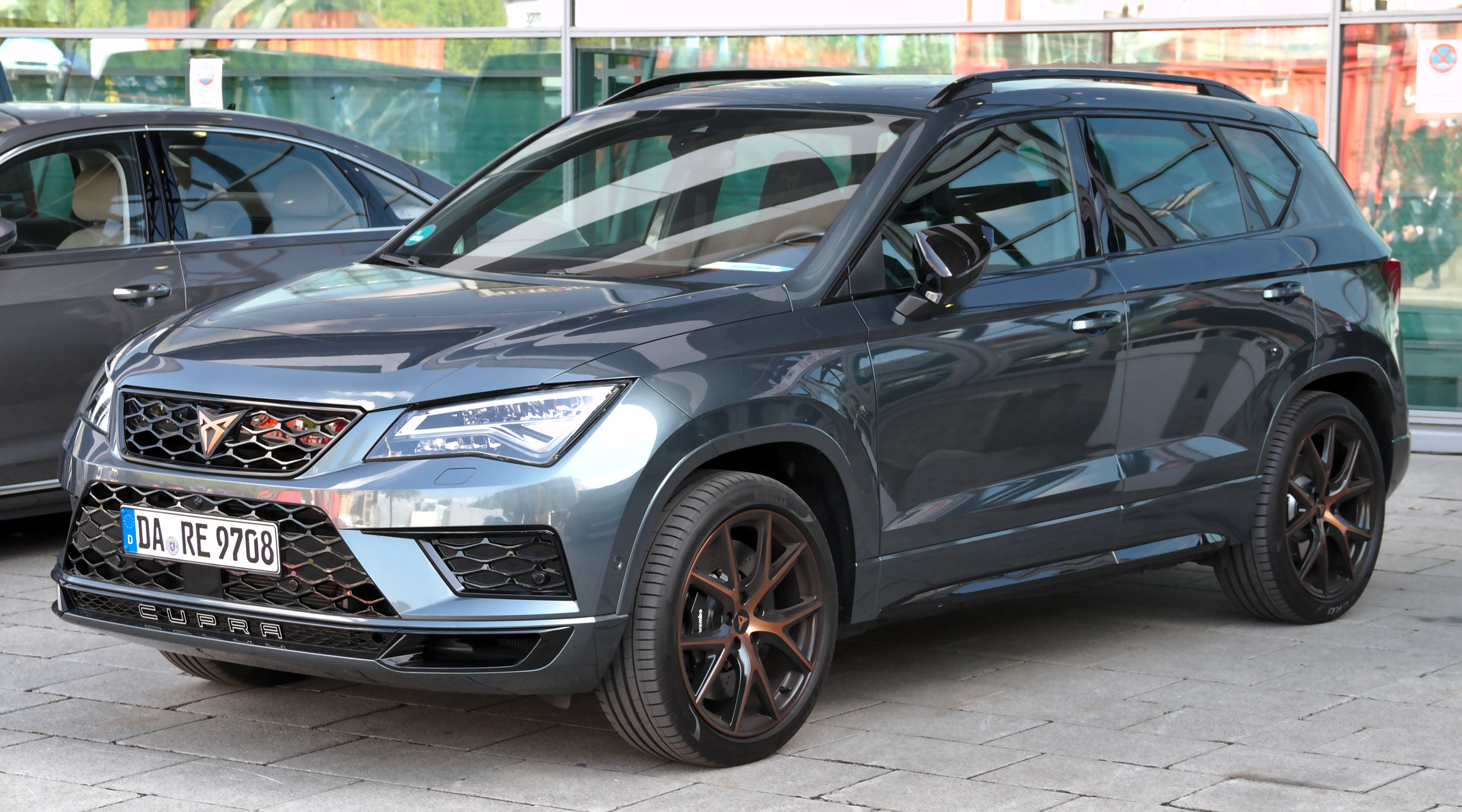
Cupra Ateca Performance

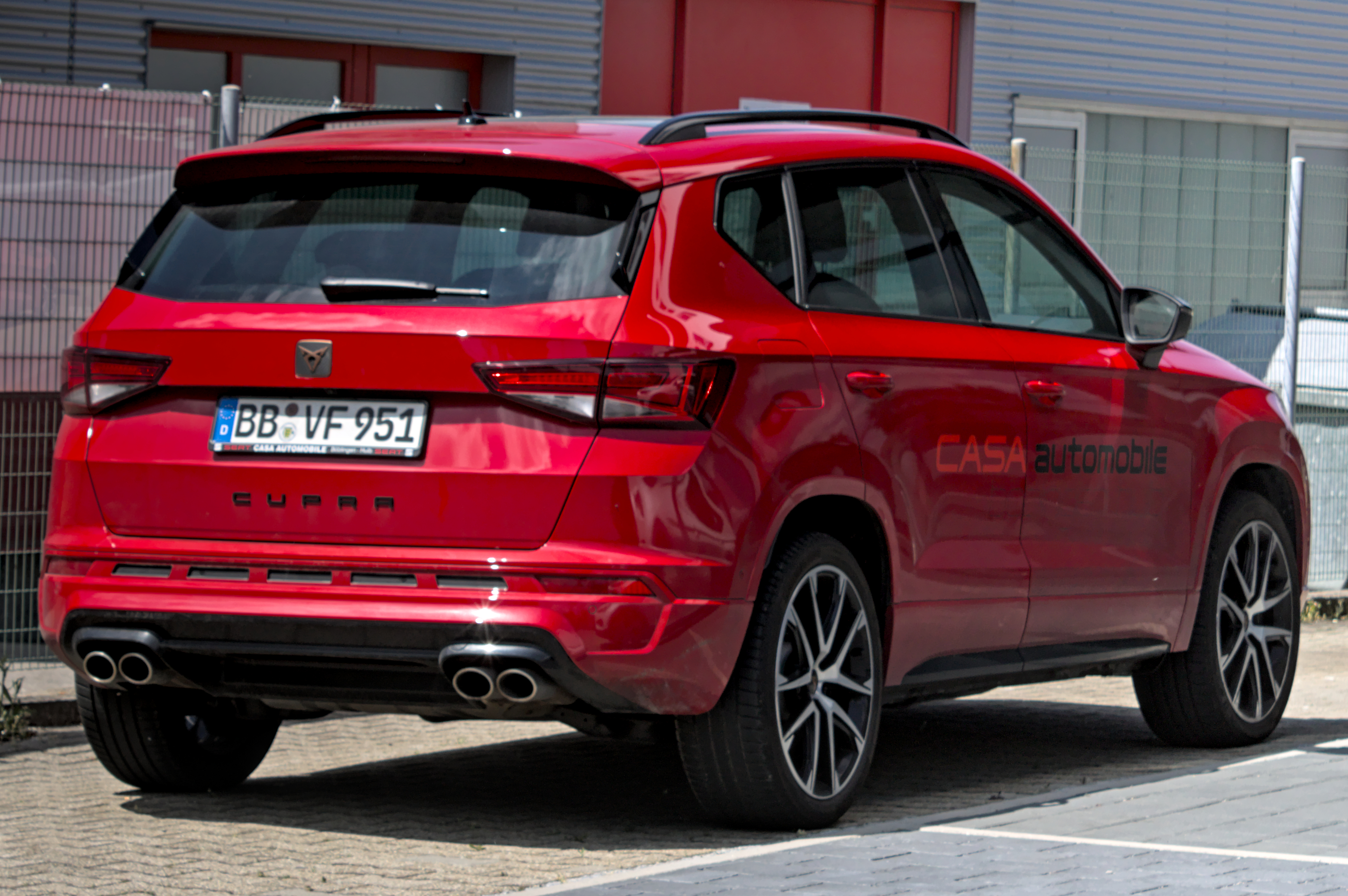
Rear view

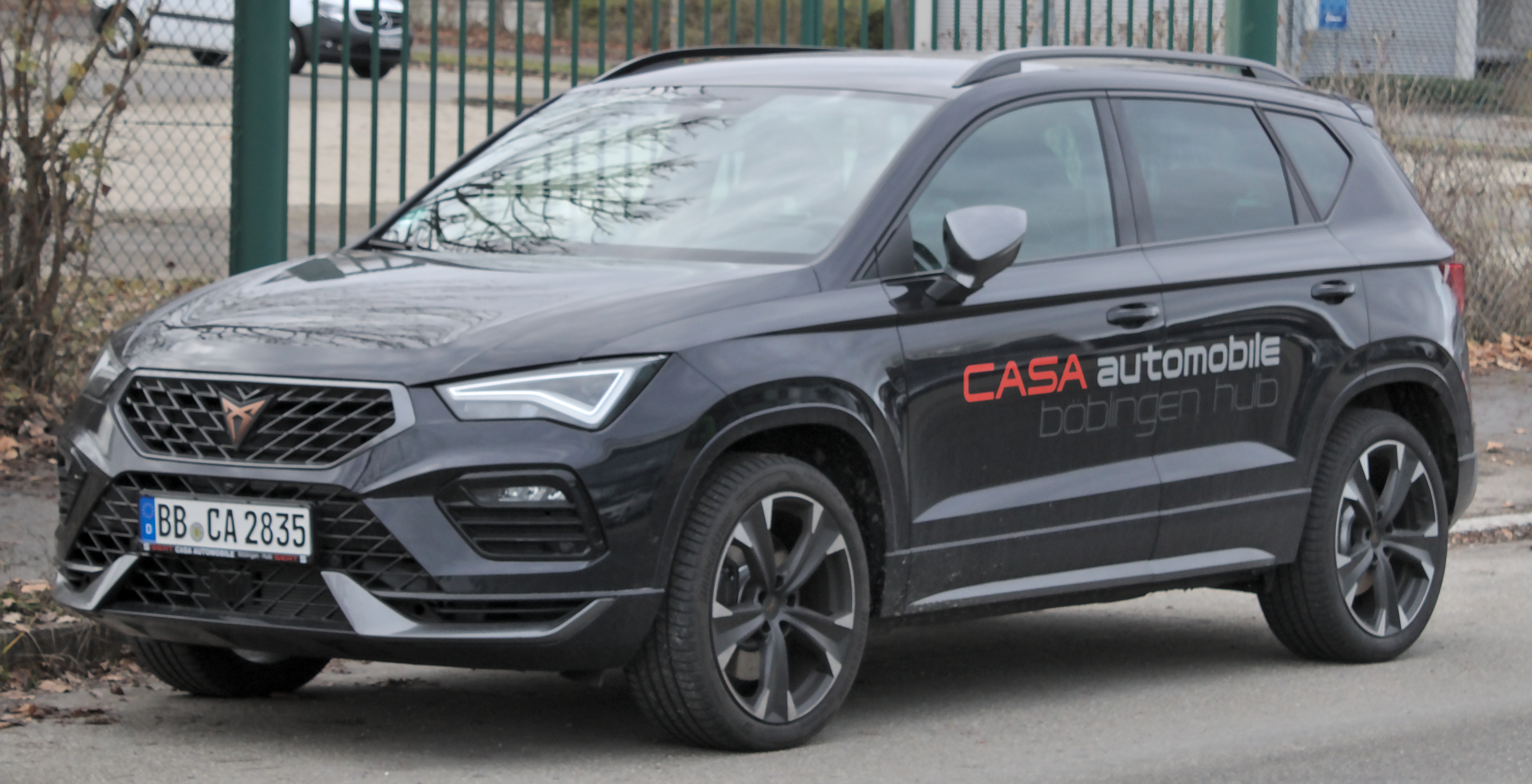
2021 Cupra Ateca (facelift)

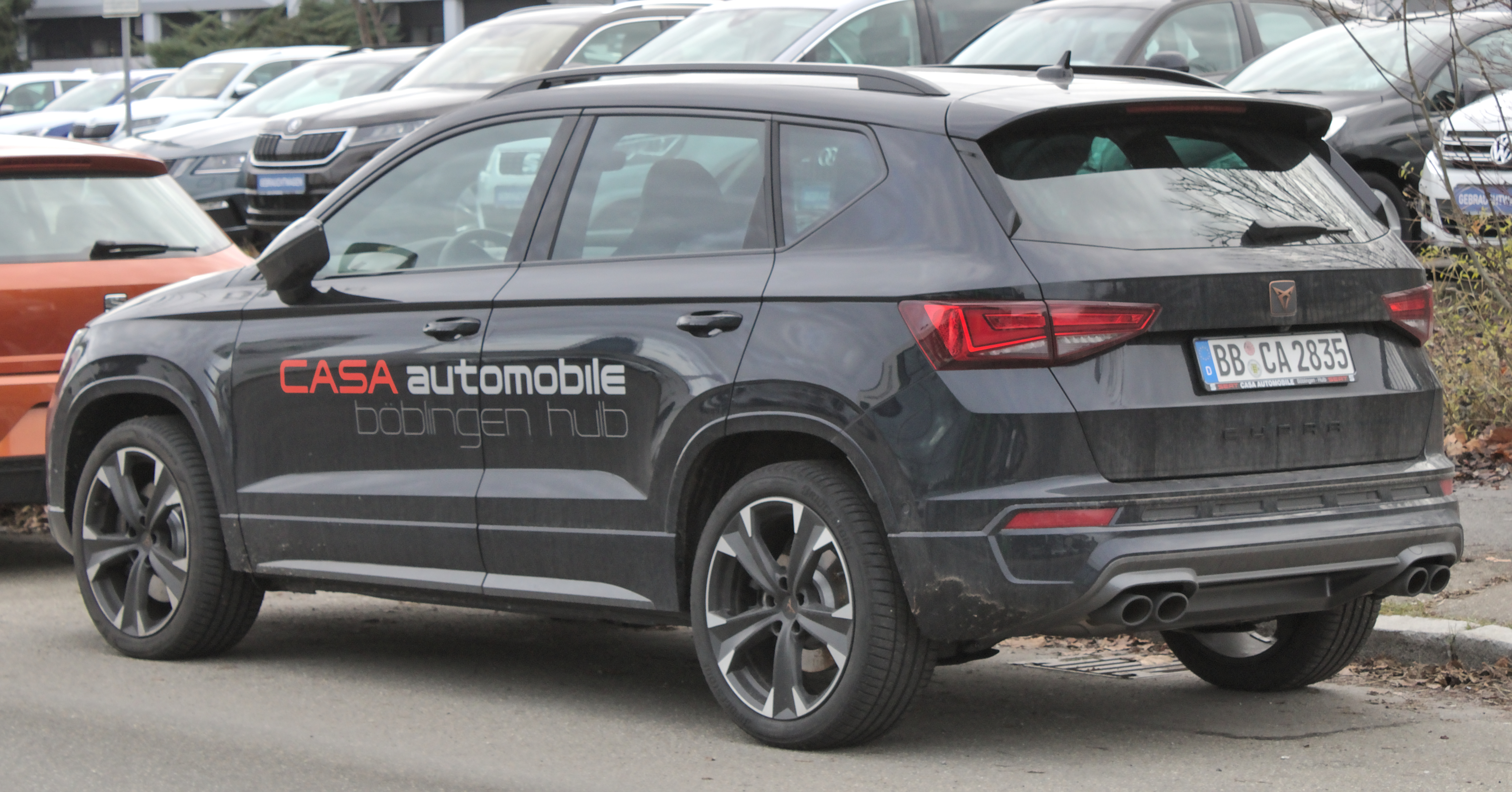
2021 Cupra Ateca (facelift)

== Powertrain ==
The entry-level petrol engine is a 1.0-litre three-cylinder turbocharged unit producing 115 PS (85 kW; 113 hp). The other petrol engine available 1.5-litre EcoTSI motor with 150 PS (110 kW; 148 hp) shared with the VW Golf and SEAT Leon, and is able to close down cylinders to save fuel when they're not required. The diesel engines are 1.6-litre with 115 PS (85 kW; 113 hp) and CO_{2} emissions of 112 g/km, which is front-wheel drive only, and a 2.0 that's offered in two power output: 150 PS (110 kW; 148 hp) and 190 PS (140 kW; 187 hp). Even the most potent diesel with four-wheel drive emits 131 g/km.

Four-wheel drive Ateca models will be named 4Drive, and are limited to the 150 PS (110 kW; 148 hp) and 190 PS (140 kW; 187 hp) diesels in top-spec XCELLENCE trim. A 7-speed DSG transmission is available on these diesel engines.

Model	Displacement	Power	Torque	Transmission
Petrol engines
1.0 EcoTSI 115	999 cc I3	115 PS (85 kW; 113 hp)	200 N⋅m (148 lb⋅ft)	6-speed manual
1.5 EcoTSI 150	1,498 cc I4	150 PS (110 kW; 148 hp)	250 N⋅m (184 lb⋅ft)	6-speed manual or 7-speed DSG
2.0 EcoTSI 190 4Drive	1,984 cc I4	190 PS (140 kW; 187 hp)	320 N⋅m (236 lb⋅ft)	7-speed DSG
2.0 EcoTSI 4Drive	1,984 cc I4	300 PS (221 kW; 296 hp)	400 N⋅m (295 lb⋅ft)	7-speed DSG
Diesel engines
1.6 TDI 115	1,598 cc I4	115 PS (85 kW; 113 hp)	250 N⋅m (184 lb⋅ft)	6-speed manual or 7-speed DSG
2.0 TDI 150 SCR 4Drive	1,968 cc I4	150 PS (110 kW; 148 hp)	320 N⋅m (236 lb⋅ft)	6-speed manual or 7-speed DSG
2.0 TDI 190 SCR 4Drive	1,968 cc I4	190 PS (140 kW; 187 hp)	400 N⋅m (295 lb⋅ft)	7-speed DSG

== Safety ==
The Czech-made Ateca in its most basic Latin American market configuration with 7 airbags received 5 stars for adult occupants, 5 stars for toddlers, and Advanced Award from Latin NCAP 2.0 in 2017.

Latin NCAP 2.0 test results Seat Ateca + 7 Airbags (2017, based on Euro NCAP 2008)
Test	Points	Stars
Adult occupant:	32.65/34.0	5 /5 stars
Child occupant:	42.48/49.00	5 /5 stars

The Ateca in its standard European market configuration was awarded 5 stars by Euro NCAP in 2016.

2016 SEAT Ateca
Euro NCAP scores (2016)
Overall	5/5 stars

== Sales and production figures ==
Year	Sales		Production
Year	Europe (Note: Europe: 2020 EU 27 + UK + Switzerland + Norway + Iceland)	Mexico	Production
2016	22,928		35,833
2017	74,692		77,483
2018	71,666	1,286	90,824
2019	90,291	1,328	98,397
2020	70,408	1,135	76,710
2021	62,449	1,555	58,500
2022	48,353	1,333	58,157
2023		2,204	83,714
2024			74,592
2025			40,205
