= SEAT IBE =

Car model

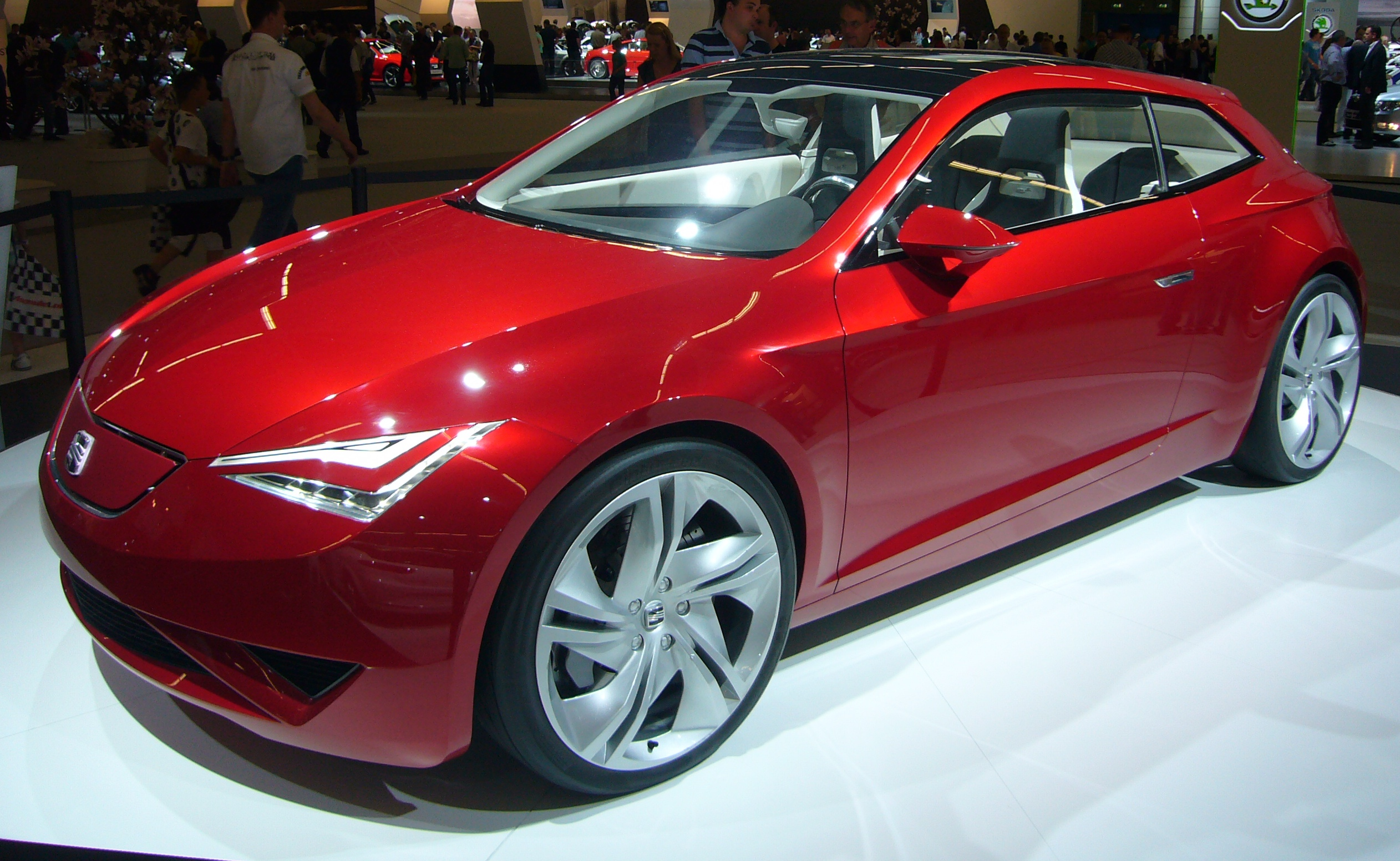

Overview
- Manufacturer: SEAT
- Production: 2010 (concept car)

Body and chassis
- Body style: 2-door Compact Sports Coupé

Powertrain
- Engine: electric motor

The SEAT IBE is an electric concept car that was first presented by the Spanish brand SEAT at the 2010 Geneva Motor Show, with a second version being introduced a few months later at the 2010 Paris Motor Show. Though it is primarily developed for urban mobility, this compact electric coupé car targets both style and driving dynamics.

== Awards ==
- “Best concept-car award” of the 2010 Paris Motor Show, by RTL and Auto Plus

== Design ==
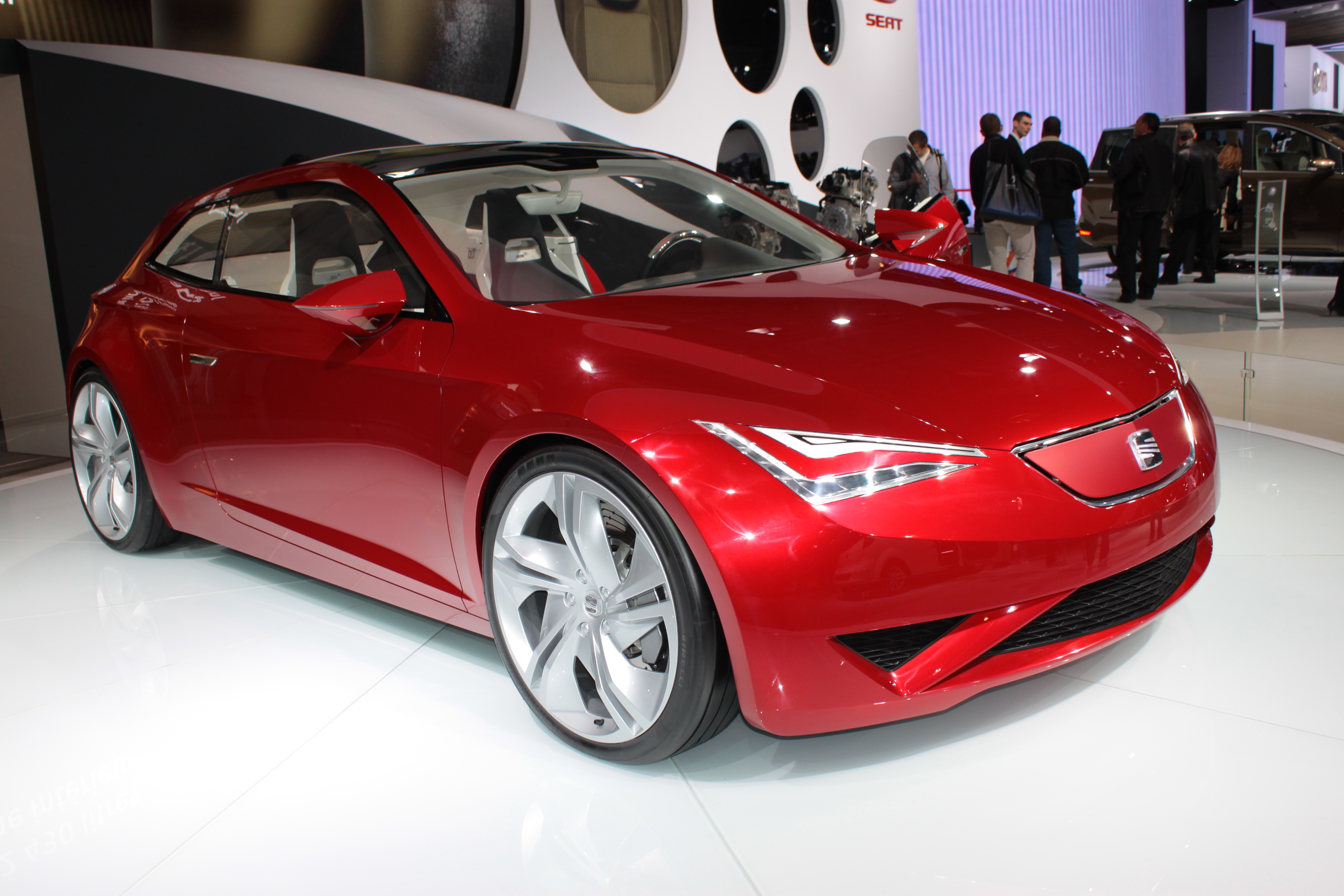
SEAT IBE v2 at the 2010 Paris Motor Show

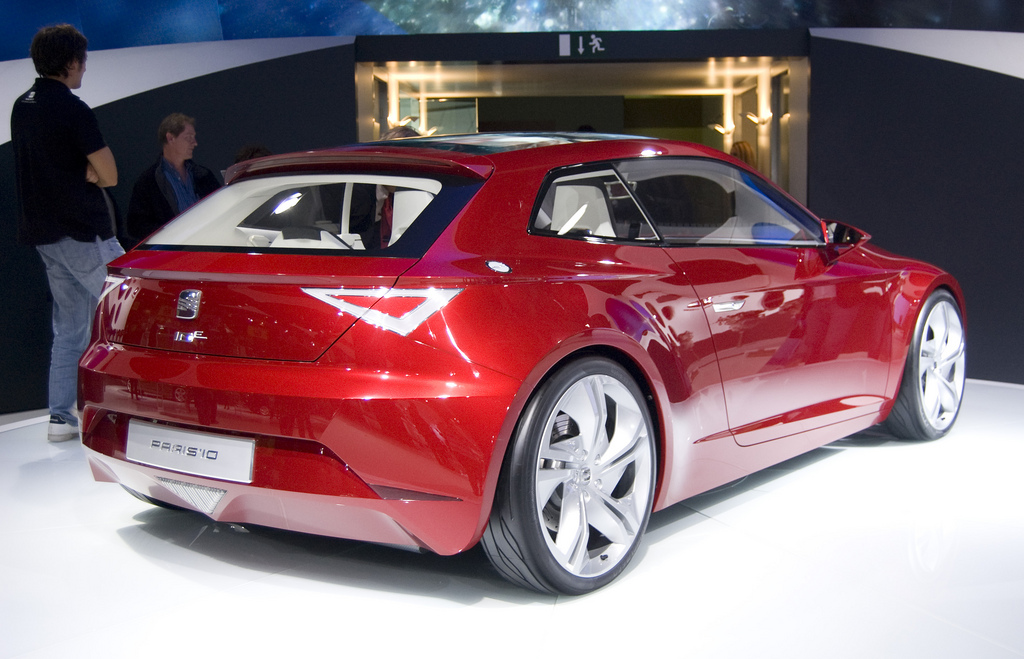
SEAT IBE v2, rear view

The SEAT's IBE is 25 centimetres shorter than a SEAT Ibiza, totalizing 3.78 metres of length. It is 1.80 metres large and 1.22 metres high. The low bonnet and the long roof line also aim to lend the two-door vehicle a sporty image.

The front end features new design full-LED headlamps, but still maintains the characteristic V-shaped lines of SEAT's “arrow design”. The rear has been inspired on the work done at the front, while the rear light clusters feature the LED light guide technology and show the “arrow” thematic with a hint of a diffuser beneath the rear bumper area that reflects the visual of the front air intakes.

== Powertrain ==
The IBE concept car is an all-electric zero emission vehicle powered by an electric engine located together with the power electronics beneath the bonnet. The battery is placed in the car's rear. With a maximum output of 75 kW and 200 Nm of torque the IBE is able to accelerate from 0 to 100 km/h in 9.4 seconds and to reach a top speed of 160 km/h.

According to SEAT, the battery, with a capacity of 18 kWh, has enough range “to cover all the daily mobility requirements of city life”.

== Other information ==
The SEAT IBE makes part of a Spanish project for the promotion and development of electric mobility in Spain. The IBE is a first step in this research supported by the Spanish Ministry for Science and Innovation (CDTI).
