= SEAT Tribu =

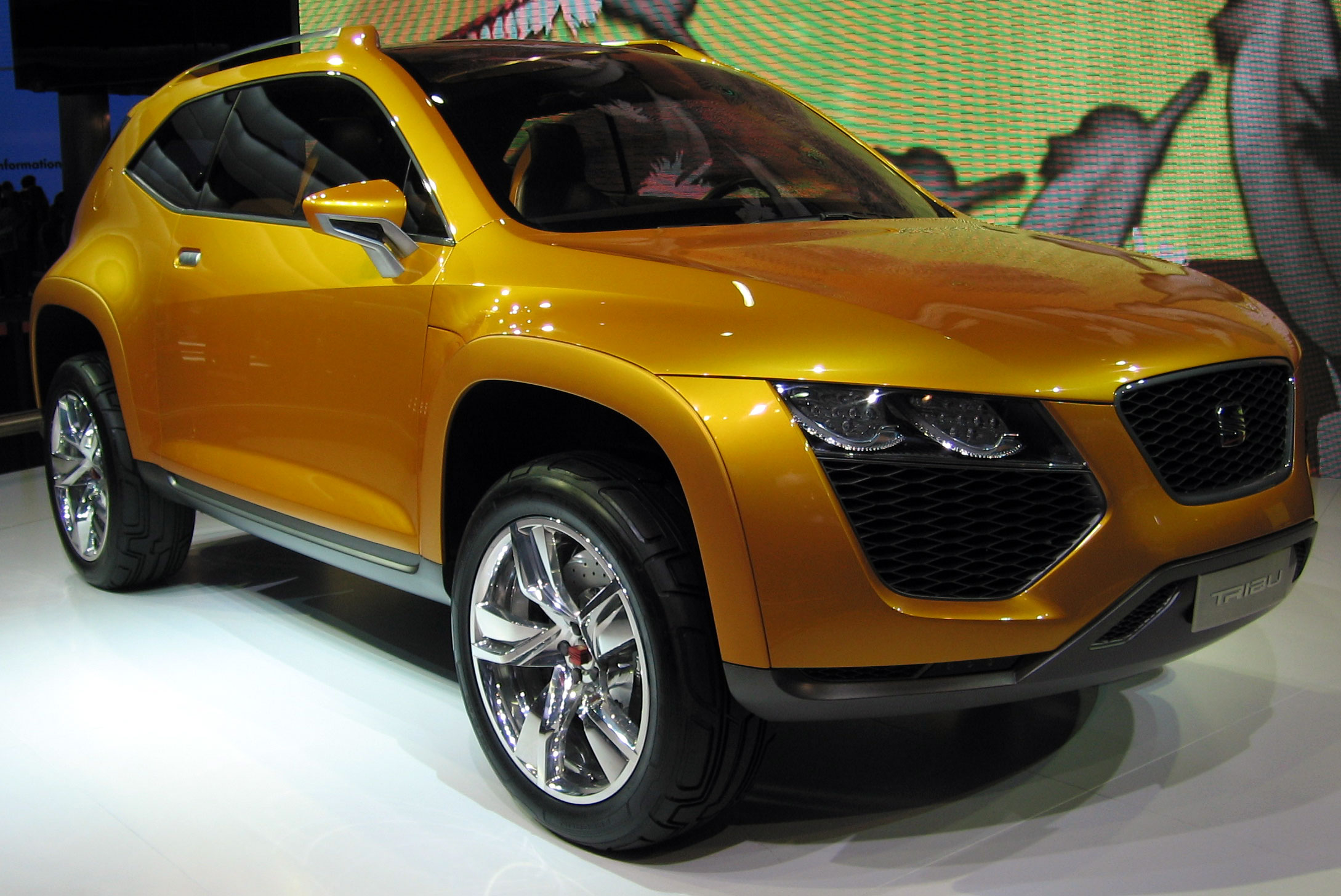

Overview
- Manufacturer: SEAT, S.A.
- Production: 2007 (Concept car)
- Designer: Luc Donckerwolke

Body and chassis
- Class: Compact crossover SUV
- Body style: 3-door SUV
- Layout: Transverse front engine, on demand four wheel drive
- Platform: Volkswagen Group A5 (PQ35)
- Related: Volkswagen Tiguan; Škoda Yeti; Audi Q3

Chronology
- Successor: SEAT Altea Freetrack; SEAT Ateca

The SEAT Tribu was a compact SUV concept car that was built by the Spanish automaker SEAT, S.A. in the autumn of 2007.

== Overview ==
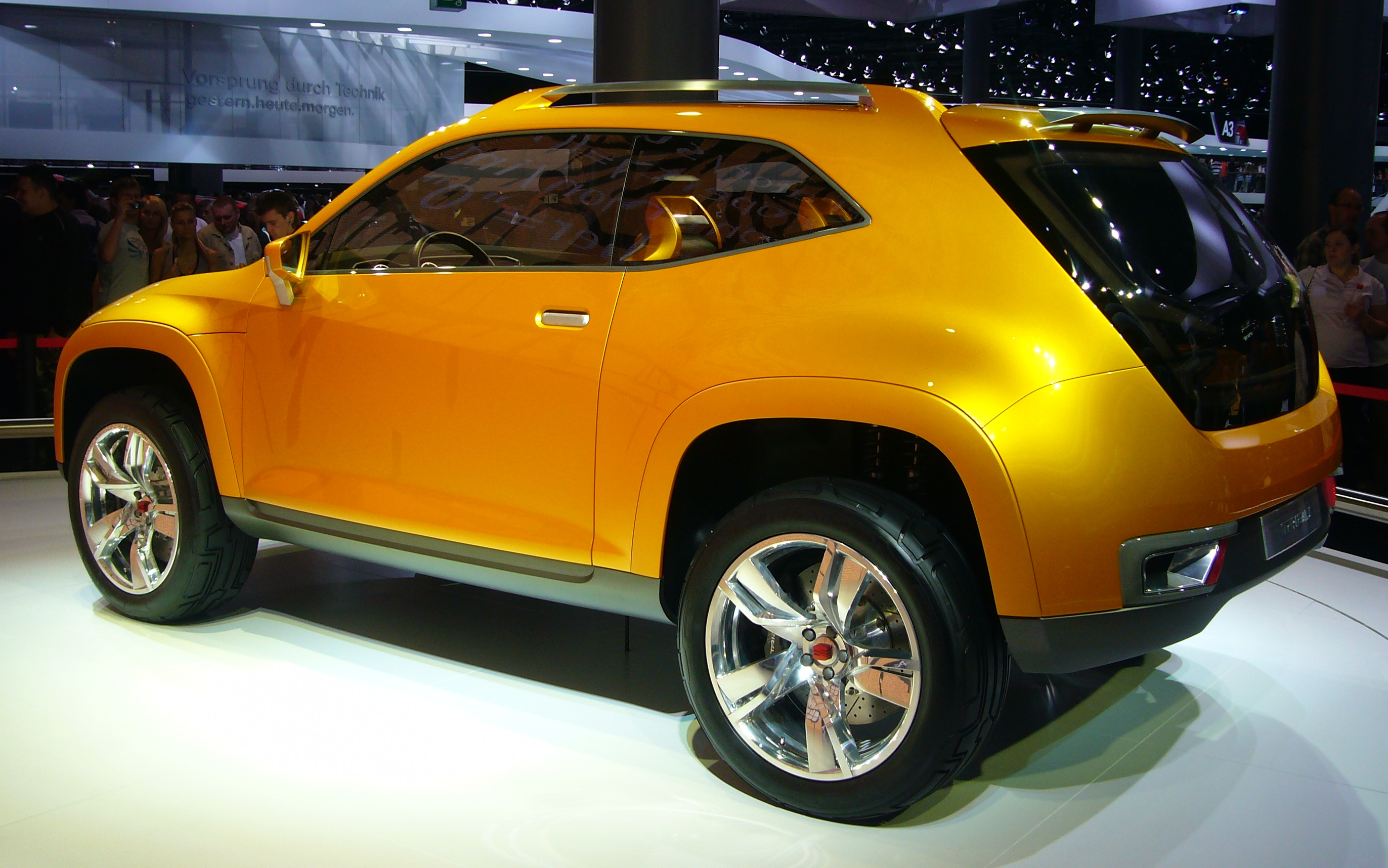
Rear view

The first time when the name Tribu was used by SEAT was at the 2007 Frankfurt Motor Show for the concept car, which featured three doors and four bucket seats. The concept SUV was the first project designed entirely by Luc Donckerwolke, the former designer for Lamborghini, who in September 2005 was appointed the Design Director for SEAT.

Official designs for SEAT of the production model were submitted to the World Intellectual Property Organization (WIPO) in August 2008, and subsequently leaked. The concept car had suffered radical changes, featuring five doors and the more conventional boot opening. It was by then due to have been released in the beginning of 2010.

Several car magazines were quick to turn these official grey-scale pictures into computer-generated images that showed the Tribu in near final form as the rebadged version of the Volkswagen Tiguan. The car did not subsequently reach production due to rough economic conditions at the time. Development had officially frozen by December 2009, and the firm had still yet to decide whether the car would ever make production.

In March 2014, Auto Express reported that SEAT were working on a family of CUVs, with an estimated release date of 2016. The vehicles were to based on the SEAT León and were inspired by the Nissan Qashqai, and would rival it. This proved to be exact with the launch of the SEAT Ateca SUV in March 2016, at the Geneva Motor Show.
