= SEAT Concepto T =

The SEAT Concepto T Coupé and Concepto T Cabrio were prototypes developed by Spanish car manufacturer SEAT which were aiming to show the company's potential under the then new ownership of the Volkswagen Group. The business was wholly acquired by the Volkswagen Group in December 1990, when Volkswagen took 99.99% ownership of the company.

== Concepto T Coupé ==
The Concepto T Coupé was introduced at the Paris Motor Show in October 1992. It is a coupé car with 2+2 seating on the basis of the SEAT Toledo Mark 1, and was designed in house by the SEAT Prototypes Centre of Development. It was presented at the motor show painted in yellow and equipped with a 200 PS (147 kW) V6 engine. Development of this concept began in 1989 with the intent of creating a Toledo Coupé. This, however, never made it to production.

== Concepto T Cabrio ==
One year later in March 1993, SEAT presented the Concepto T Cabrio at the Barcelona Motor Show. This soft top cabriolet was painted a reddish colour. The Concepto T Cabrio was equipped with the same 200 PS V6 Engine as had been used in the T Coupé.
