= SEAT 20V20 =

Concept SEAT 2015 Geneva Motor Show

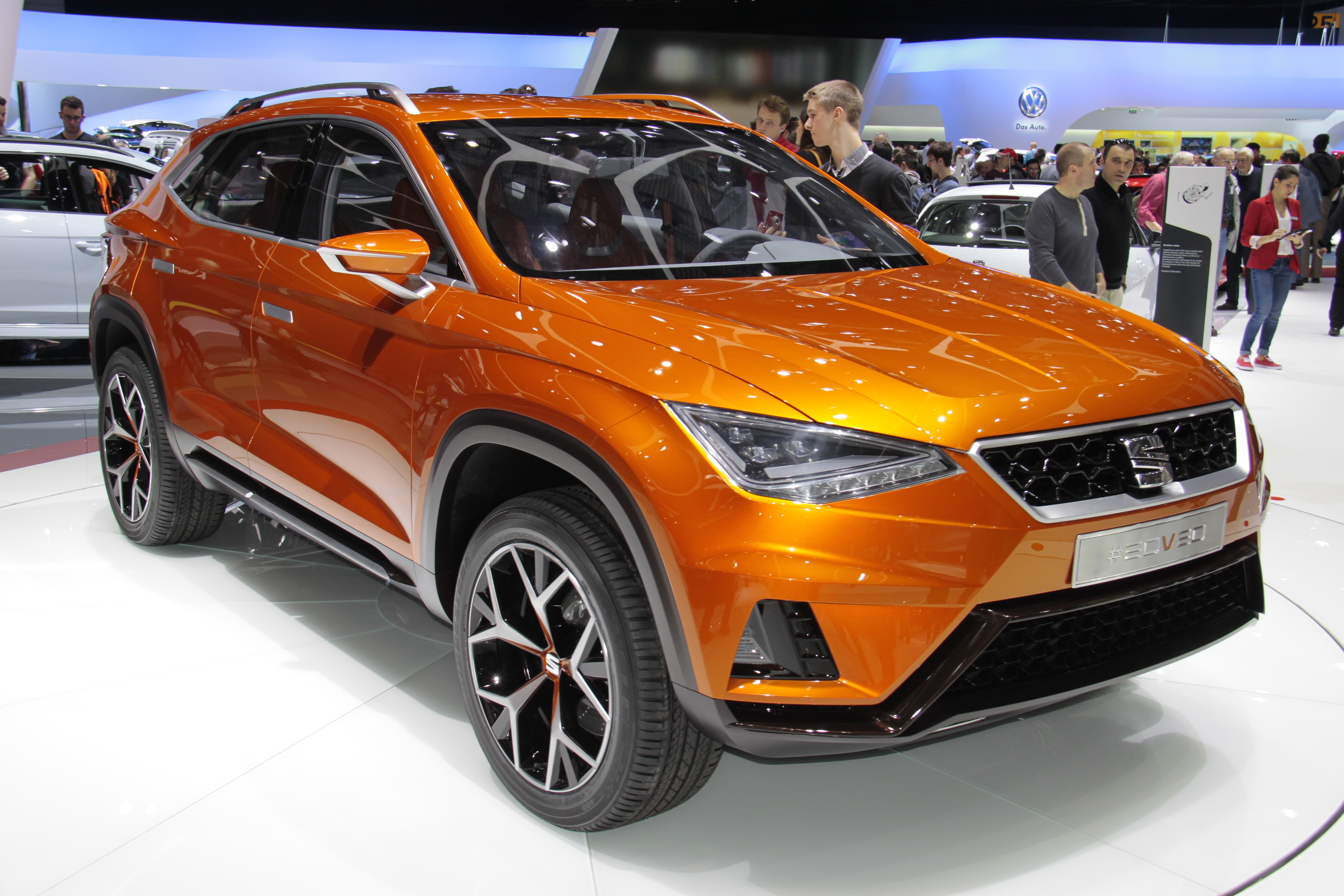

Overview
- Manufacturer: SEAT, SA
- Production: 2015 (concept car)
- Designer: Alejandro Mesonero-Romanos

Body and chassis
- Body style: 5-door SUV
- Layout: Four-wheel drive

Powertrain
- Transmission: DSG automatic

Dimensions
- Wheelbase: 2,791 mm (109.9 in)
- Length: 4,659 mm (183.4 in)
- Width: 1,648 mm (64.9 in)

The SEAT 20V20 is an SUV concept car presented by the Spanish manufacturer SEAT at the March 2015 Geneva Salon International de l’Auto. The name 20V20 stands for Vision veinte veinte (Spanish for 'Vision of the Year 2020'), referring to how the brand was seeing its future for that date.

Design elements from this concept were later used in the SEAT Tarraco, which went into production in October 2018. The exterior design of the prototype had an orange five-door bodywork and large dimensions, its length being 4,659 mm (183 in) and its boot having more than 600 litres (20 cu ft) capacity. The interior was customized to the extent of any concept car – a combination of grey, brown and white colours in both plastics and its Poltrona Frau leather upholstery – and the dashboard design was influenced by that of the third-generation SEAT Leon.

== Powertrain ==
Power is provided in many configurations, throughout either solely internal combustion engines or in a plug in hybrid combination with electric motors. The internal combustion engine powertrains comprise petrol fueled TSI engines with a horsepower of up to 220 kW (300 PS) and diesel fueled TDI engines up to 176 kW (240 PS), while the hybrid versions can be operated with the option for battery power alone.

The power output is delivered to the wheels via a DSG automatic transmission and an electronically controlled all wheel drive powertrain.

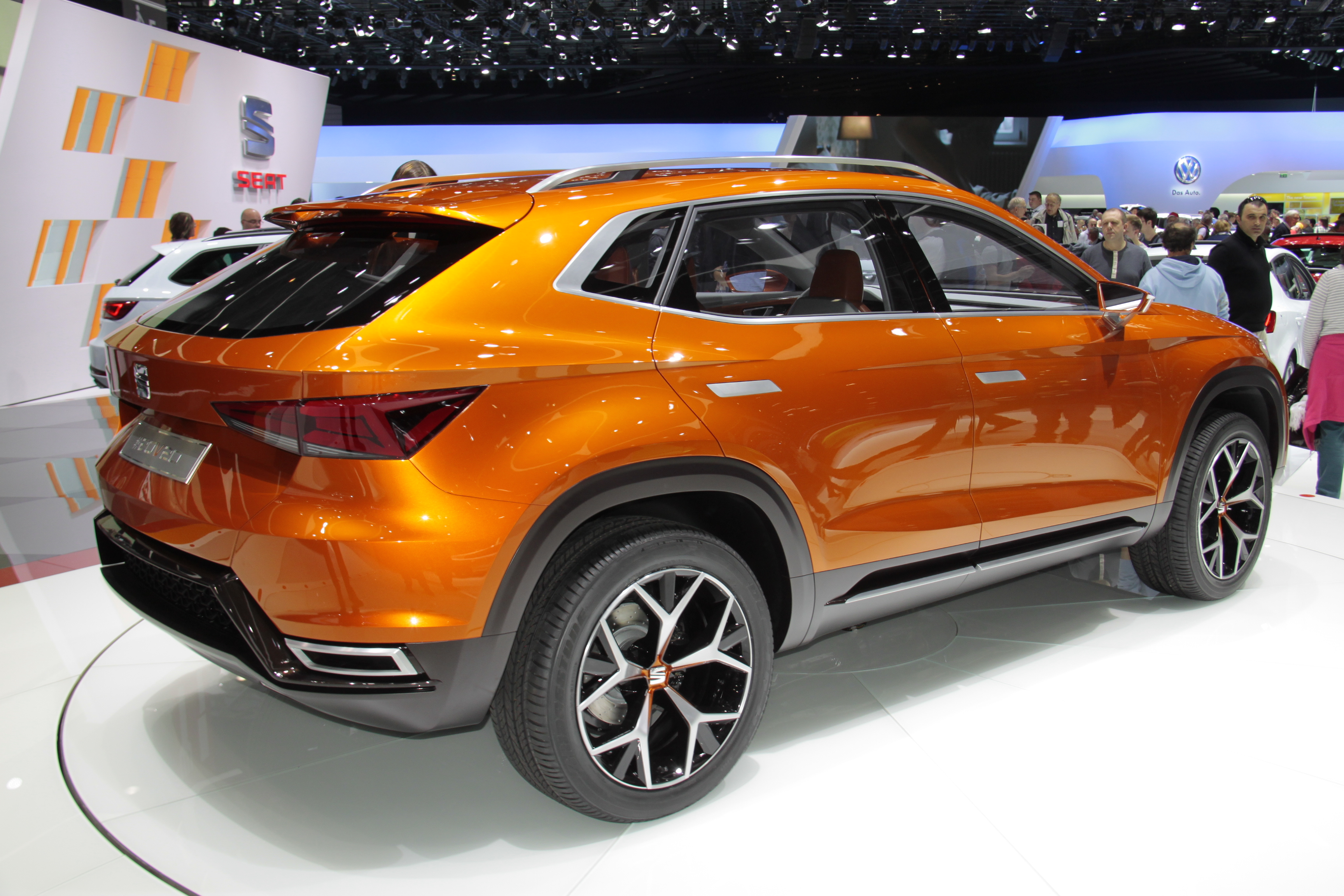
Rear view

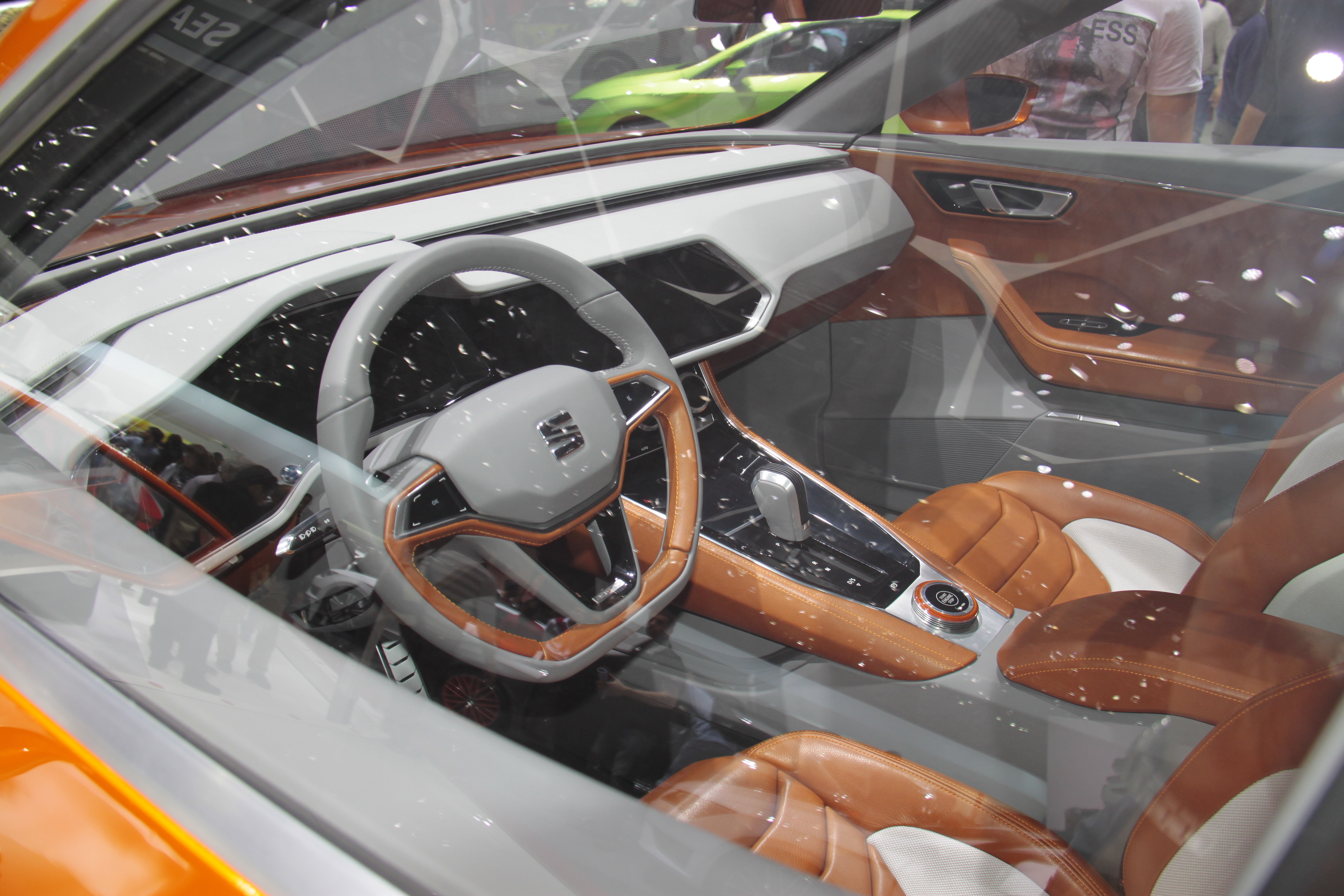
Interior
