= List of microcars by country of origin: S =

== List ==
Country	Automobile Name	Manufacturer	Engine Make/Capacity	Seats	Year	Other information
Soviet Union	SMZ cycle-car	Serpukhov Motor Works, Serpukhov	346 cc	2	1958-1997	
Spain	Bambi	Manufacturas Mecanicas Aleu, S.A, Barcelona	Aleu 125 cc	2	1952	
Spain	Biscúter 100	Autonacional S.A., Barcelona	Hispano-Villiers, 197 cc	2	1953-1959	
Spain	Biscúter 200A	Autonacional S.A., Barcelona	Hispano-Villiers, 197 cc	2		
Spain	Biscúter 200C	Autonacional S.A., Barcelona	Hispano-Villiers, 197 cc	4		Woodie
Spain	Biscúter 200F	Autonacional S.A., Barcelona	Hispano-Villiers, 197 cc	2	1957-1959	
Spain	Biscúter 200L	Autonacional S.A., Barcelona	Hispano-Villiers, 197 cc	2		Van
Spain	Clua	Construcciones Metálicas Clua, Barcelona	497 cc	2	1958-1959	
Spain	C.M.V.	Construcciones Moviles de Valencia, Valencia	electric motor		1944-1946	
Spain	Dagsa	Defensa Antigas SA, Segovia	500 cc	4	1951-1952	
Spain	David	David SA, Barcelona	David 345 cc	2	1950-1956	
Spain	Electrociclo	Electrociclo SA, Barrio Chonta, Eibar, Guipúzcoa	electric motor	2	1945-1946	
Spain	PVT 250	Automoviles Utilitarios S. A. Barcelona	250cc	2+1	1956-1961	
Spain	PVT 400	Automoviles Utilitarios S. A. Barcelona	400cc	2+1	1958-1961	
Spain	Kapi	Automóviles y Autoscooter Kapi Barcelona	Hispano-Villiers 125cc	2	1950-1955	
Spain	Triver	Construcciones Acorazadas, S.A. Bilbao	TR-500cc	2+2	1955-1961	Only 80 units created, only 75 sell 1956-61, Only one preserved today on private collection of Claudi Roca
Sweden	Fram King Fulda					The Swedish cars differ from the Germans in that they used fibreglass bodies earlier, they are more rounded and the build quality is better.
Sweden	Mopedbi					late 1970s
Sweden	Norsjö Shopper					1960s to 1994
Switzerland	Belcar	A. Grünhut & Co, Wollerau	Victoria 200 cc	3	1955-1957	Licence built version of the Brütsch "Spatz"
Switzerland	TWIKE		electric motor, optional plus pedals for both persons			low drag, high efficiency; later: Germany
