= PTV (car) =

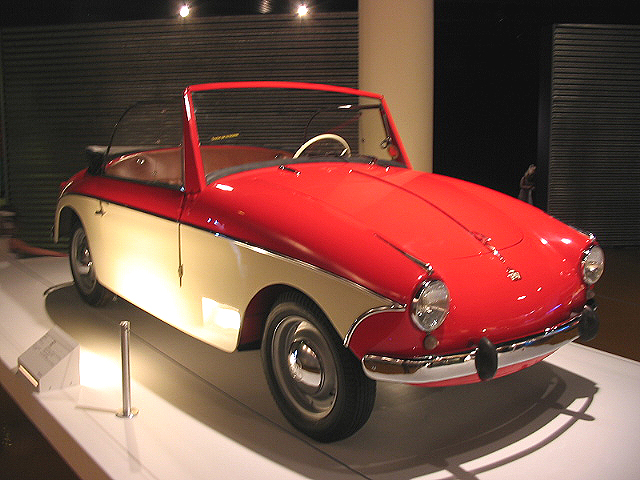
PTV 250

PTV was a trademark of Automóviles Utilitarios S. A. a microcar manufacturer based in Manresa, near Barcelona, Spain. The PTV brand was at one time the second biggest volume microcar sold in Spain, beaten only by the Biscúter. Compared to the Biscúter it was more luxurious, offering proper doors, two-tone paint, chrome trim and 12 inch wheels.

The first prototype was finished in 1956, powered by an in-house developed rear mounted 250 cc engine giving 13 hp (10 kW) and a top speed of 95 km/h (59 mph). This engine was later replaced by a 350 cc unit. However, when Fiat licensed their Fiat 600 for construction in Spain as the SEAT 600, sales dropped and the company reformed as AUSA Center SA - a constructor and supplier of industrial machinery and light vehicles, with branches in Madrid Spain, Perpignan France, Rochdale England, Hamm Germany, Alberta Canada and Beijing China.

== History ==
The story begins with vehicles that the brothers Tachó developed in 1950 La Ballena (The Whale) and in 1953 The Coca that were both marketed under the Tachó brand name.

Guillem and Antoni Tachó were joined by Maurici Josep Vila Perramón and together they founded the company Automóviles Utilitarios, S.A. on May 4, 1956. The trade-mark PTV comes From Tachó-Perramón vehículo plus a distinctive number.

The PTV 250 was the first model produced. in 1956. It was an attractive 2-seater convertible (2 + 1 according to the advertising brochure) with a rear-mounted 250 cc single-cylinder,11 horsepower (c. 8KWmotor, and capable of speeds up to 75 km /h (about 45 mph). There were two versions: either with or without doors. A total of 1100 units were produced un to 1961, which ranks as the fourth (by volume) micro-car sold in Spain, after the Biscúter, the Goggomobil and Isetta. Prices ranged between 44,500 and 55,000 Ptas. They were mostly marketed in Spain with some units exported to Portugal.

== Specification of the PTV 250 ==
- Motor: single-cylinder two-stroke transverse pistons. Bore x stroke: 66 x 72 mm. Displacement: 247 cc. Compression ratio 6,2:1. Carburetor Tachó monocoque of 22 mm. bore Power: 11 hp at 4,500 rpm. Coil ignition, 12 v. battery with 130 amps per dynamo.
- Transmission: rear wheel drive, 3 speeds and reverse. Multi-disc clutch in oil bath.
- Frame: Front Suspension: Independent with hydraulic shock absorbers and rear Panhard torsion bar, with hydraulic dampers. Brakes: Hydraulic Drum brakes on all four wheels. Steering: Helical Screw centrally mounted. Wheels: steel hub 12" tires 400 x 12.
- Body: Simple sheet over steel tubular frame. 2 seats with the fuel tank of 18 liters. Wheelbase: 1,800 mm. Front track: 1,000 mm. Rear track: 1,000 mm. Dimensions (length x width x height): 2,950 x 1,320 x 1,250 mm. Weight: 330 kg.
- 'Maximum speed: 75 km / h Average consumption: 4.5 L/100 km (45 mph / 52 miles per US gallon).

== Specification of the PTV 400 ==
- Motor: two-cylinder two-stroke transverse pistons. Bore x stroke: 66 x 58 mm. Displacement: 396.83 cc. 6.5:1 compression ratio. Tachó Carburetor 22 mm bore plus rotary supercharger. Power: 19 hp at 4,500 rpm. Coil ignition. battery 12 V with 130 A for dynamo.
- Transmission: Rear drive, 4 speed and reverse. Multi-disc clutch in oil bath.
- Frame: front independent suspension with hydraulic shock absorbers and rear Panhard torsion bars, with hydraulic dampers. Brakes: Hydraulic Drums on all four wheels steering: helical screw central mounted. Wheels: steel hubs 12 "tires 520 x 12.
- Body: monocoque sheet metal on steel tubular frame, 2 seater with the fuel tank of 18 liters. Wheelbase: 1940 mm. Front track: 1,090 mm. Rear track: 1,115 mm. Dimensions (length x width x height): 3,260 x 1,380 x 1,170 mm. Weight: 470 kg.
- Maximum speed: 110 km / h and average consumption: 5 L/100 km. (c. 70 mph at 47 Miles per US Gallon)
