= Wood trim =

Type of fascia

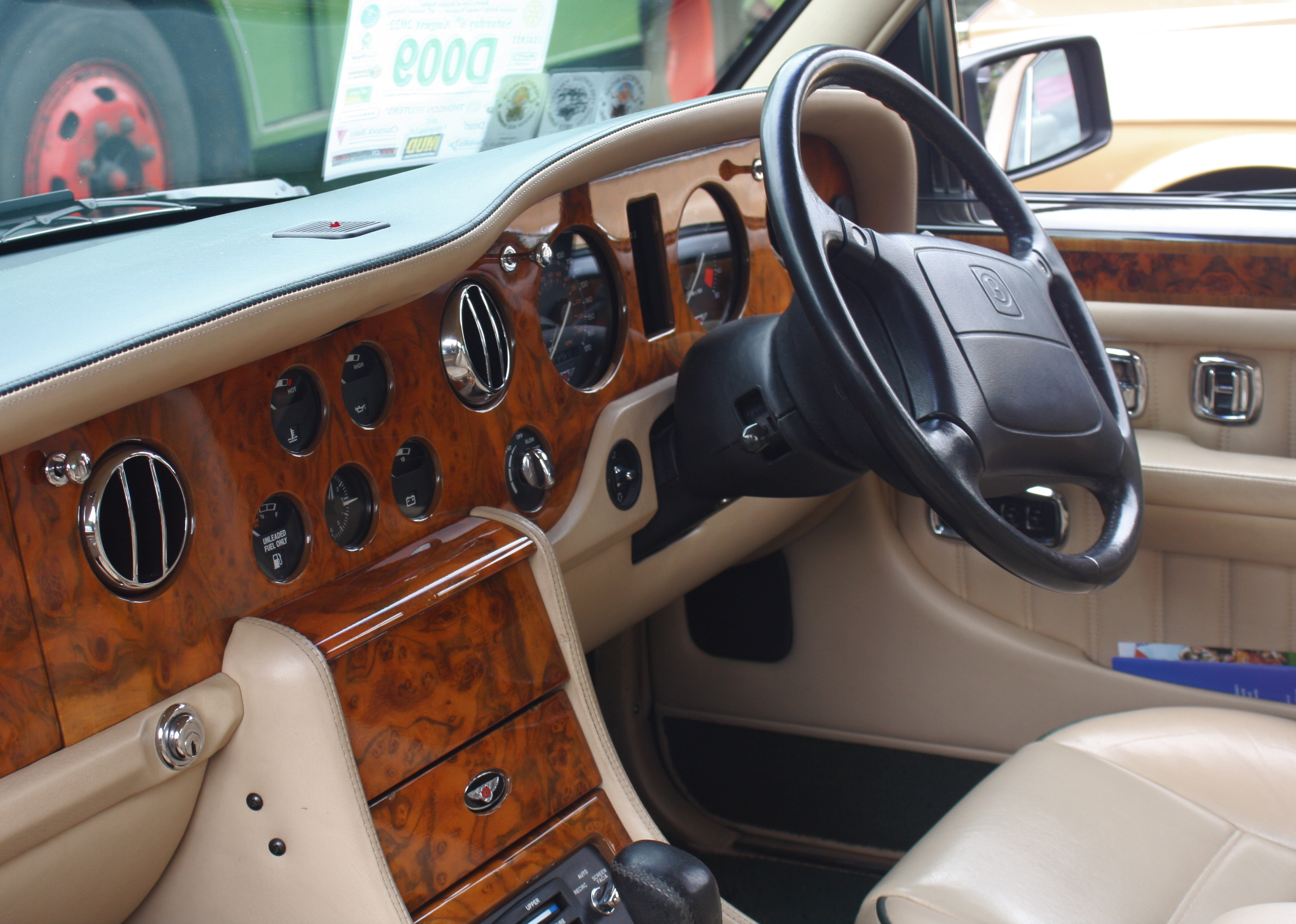
Wood trim on the dashboard of a 1995 Bentley Brooklands

Wood trim, alternatively known as woodgrain, is a fascia made of synthetic or varnished wood, usually found in the interior of luxury cars. Wood trim can be made from natural materials like beechwood, maple, walnut, oak, or from synthetic materials.

Wood trim was popular throughout the 20th century, particularly in luxury cars. It dates back to the very first automobiles, which often were partially constructed out of wood. Towards the later part of the century, many automakers began using various types of fake or synthetic wood to cut down on costs. Beginning around the late 20th century, wood trim began to fall in popularity, being replaced by plastic, carbon fiber or aluminum composites in many cars. Wood trim is still offered on many luxury cars, and third party kits consisting of veneer can be found for retrofitting wood trim into cars that did not come with it. Wood trim has seen a slight resurgence in recent years with the use of sustainably sourced and reclaimed wood by automakers looking to appeal to environmentally conscious buyers.

== See also ==
- Woodie (car body style)
