= Woodie (car body style) =

Automobile with wood or wood-styled bodywork

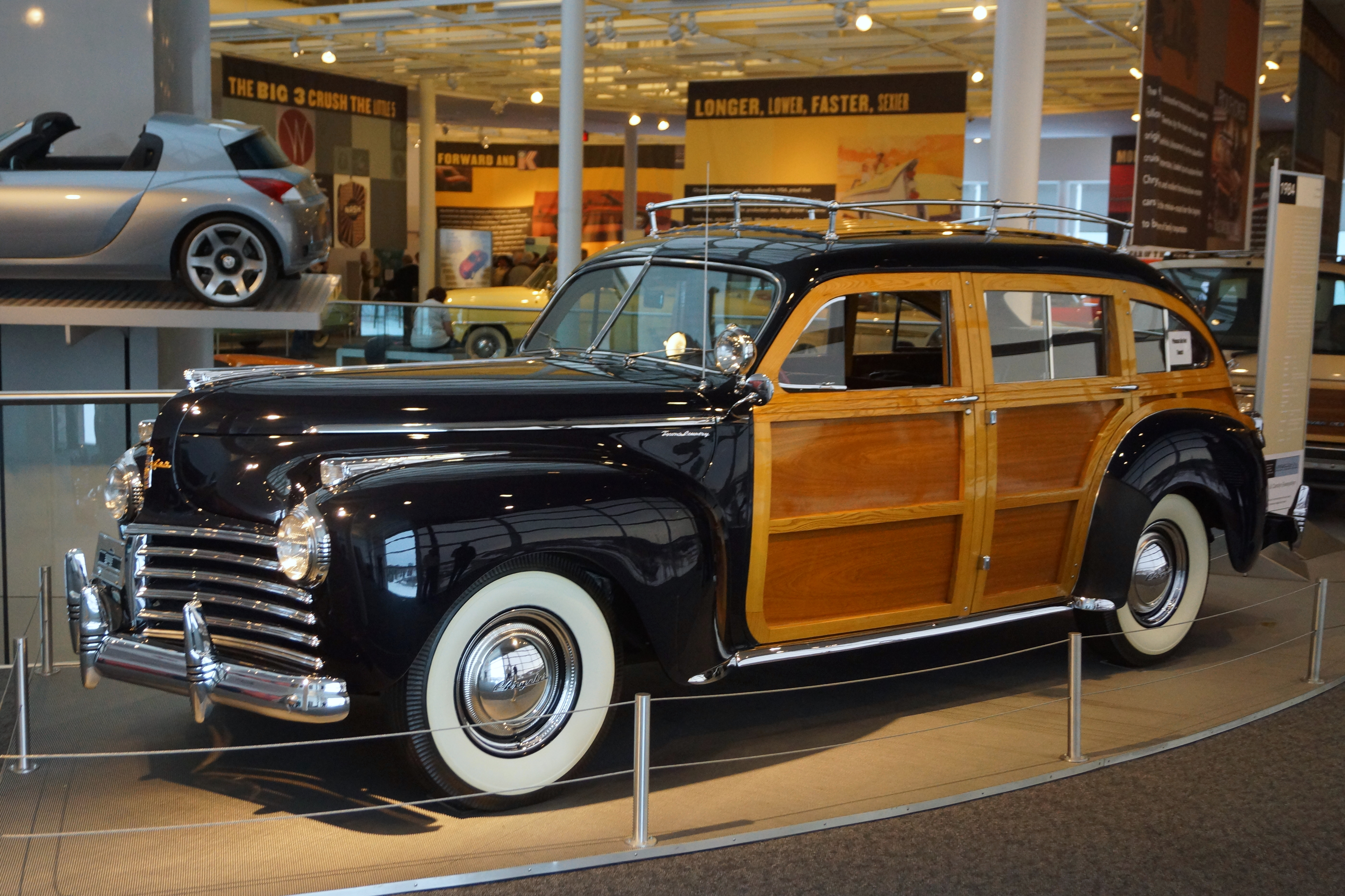
1941 Chrysler Windsor Town & Country

A woodie (or a woodie wagon) is an automobile where the bodywork is constructed of wood or is styled to resemble wood elements. The appearance of polished wood gave a resemblance to fine wooden furniture, and on many occasions the wood theme continued to the dashboard and inner door panels, including the rear tailgate.

Originally, wood framework augmented the car's structure. Over time, manufacturers supplanted wood construction with a variety of materials and methods evoking wood construction – including infill metal panels, metal framework, or simulated wood-grain sheet vinyl bordered with three-dimensional, simulated framework. Wood construction has also been evoked abstractly on the Nissan Pao (1989–1991) and Ford Flex (2009–2019), with a series of horizontal grooves and strakes.

== History ==
=== 1930s and 1940s ===
As a variant of body-on-frame construction, the woodie as a utility vehicle or station wagon originated from the early practice of manufacturing the passenger compartment portion of a vehicle in hardwood. It was a modern interpretation of an earlier horse-drawn wagon called a shooting brake which was made entirely of wood used to transport hunting spoils, gun racks, and ammunition on shooting trips.

Woodies were popular in the United States and were produced as variants of sedans and convertibles as well as station wagons, from basic to luxury. They were typically manufactured as third-party conversions of regular vehicles – some by large, reputable coachbuilding firms and others by local carpenters and craftsmen for individual customers. They could be austere vehicles, with side curtains in lieu of roll-up windows (e.g., the 1932 Ford) – and sold in limited numbers (e.g., Ford sold 1654 woodie wagons). Eventually, bodies constructed entirely in steel supplanted wood construction – for reasons of strength, cost, safety, and durability.

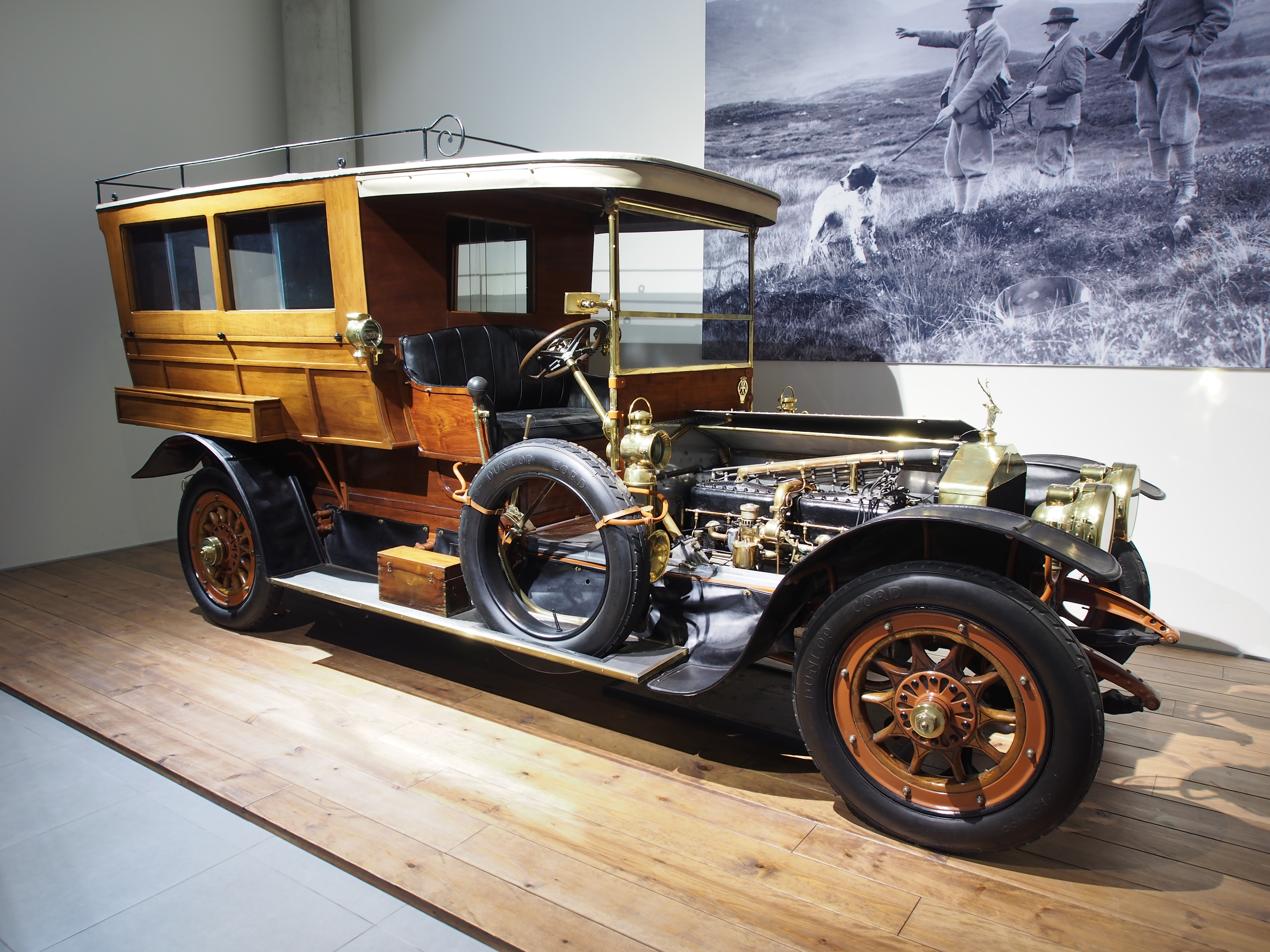
1910 Rolls-Royce Silver Ghost with original woodie coachwork by Scottish coachbuilder Croall & Croall

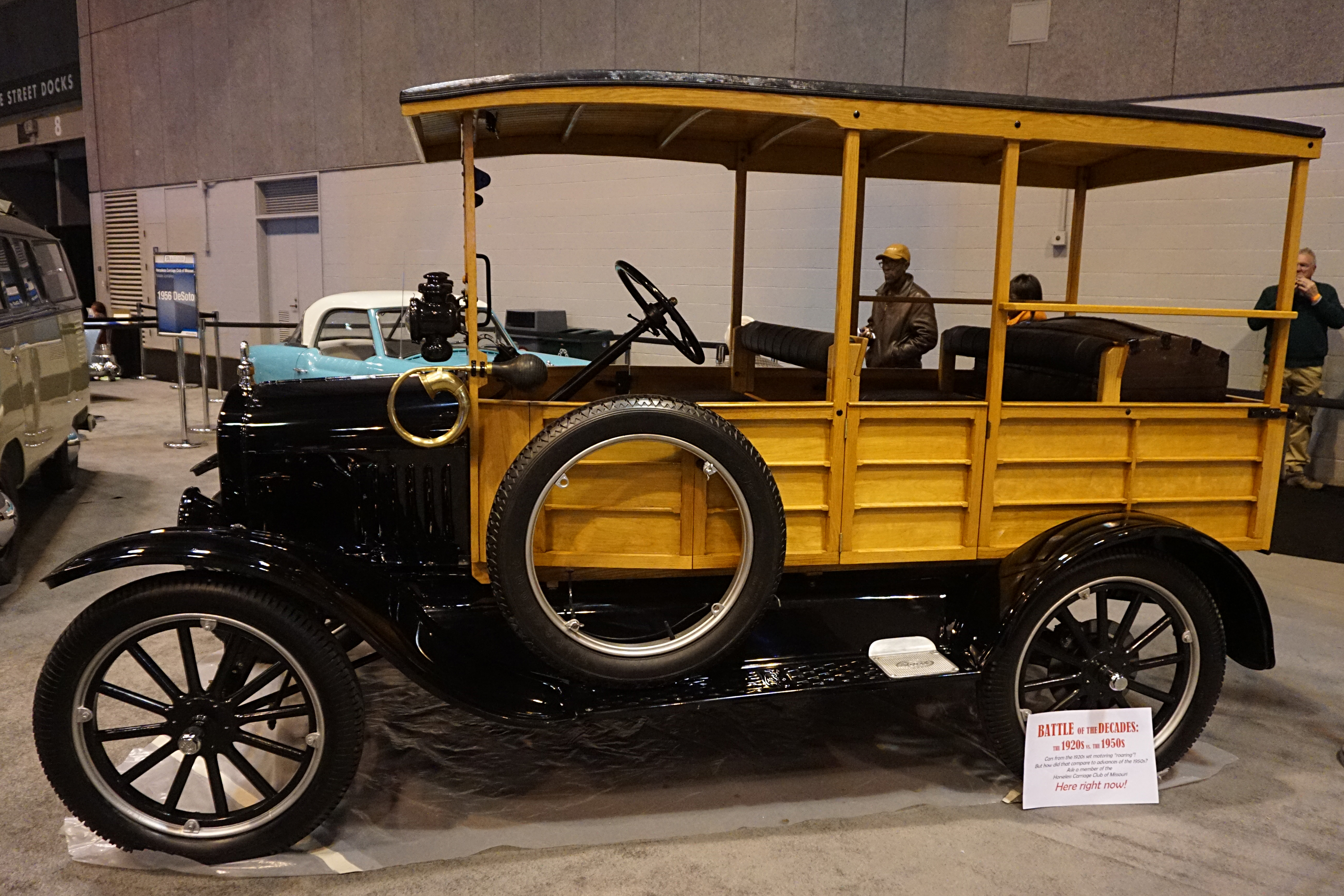
1923 Ford Model T Depot Hack woodie

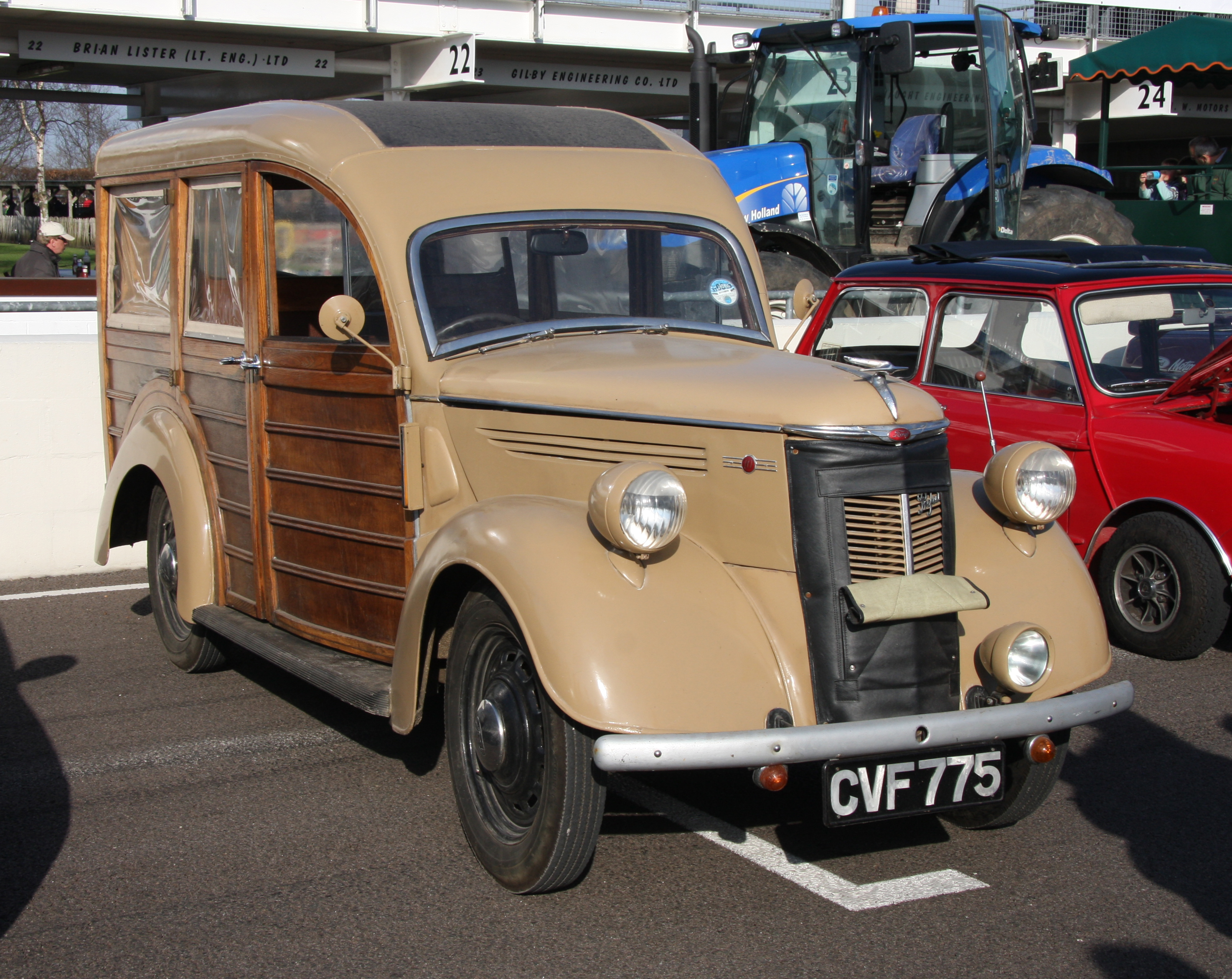
1938 Ford Prefect woodie

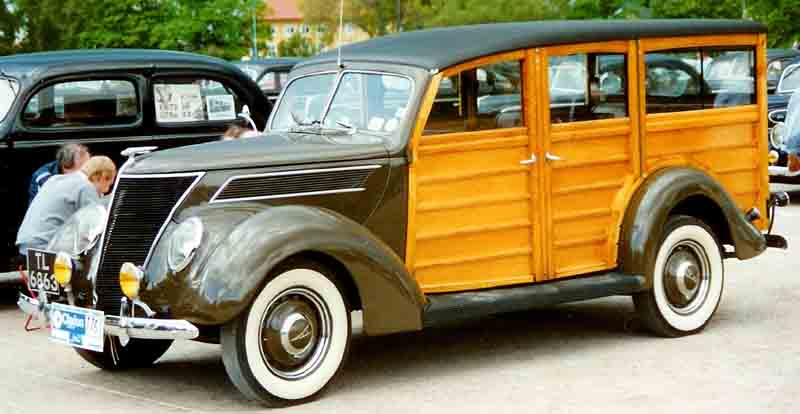
1937 Ford Deluxe Station Wagon

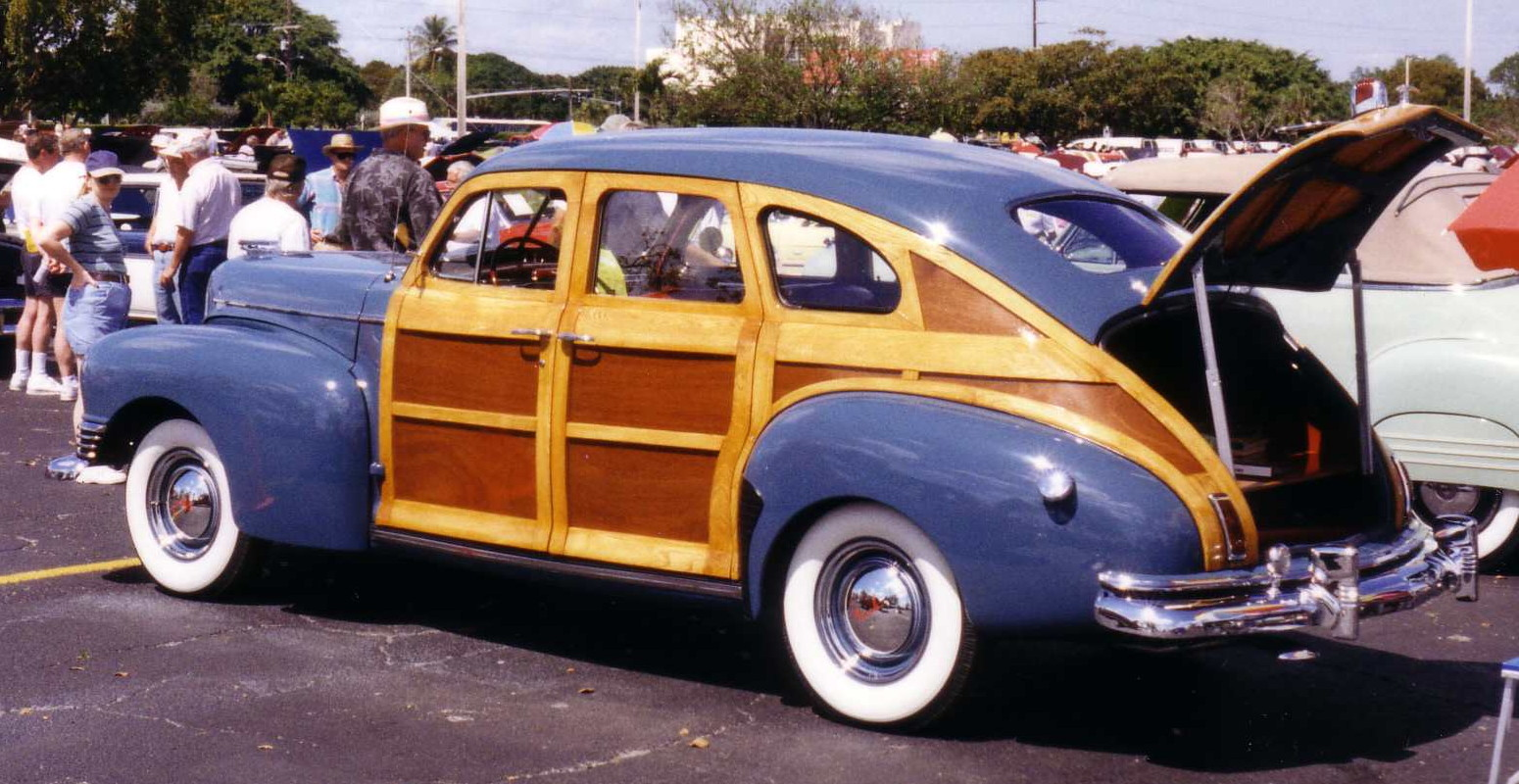
1946–1948 Nash Ambassador Suburban

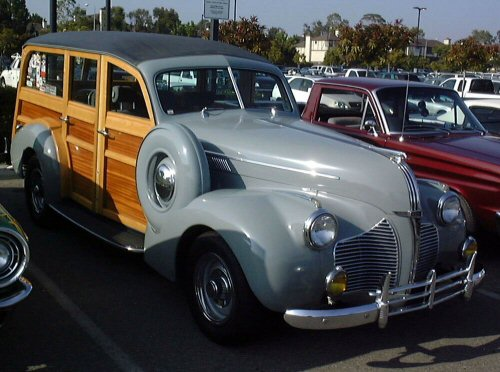
1940 Pontiac Torpedo Special Series 25 woodie

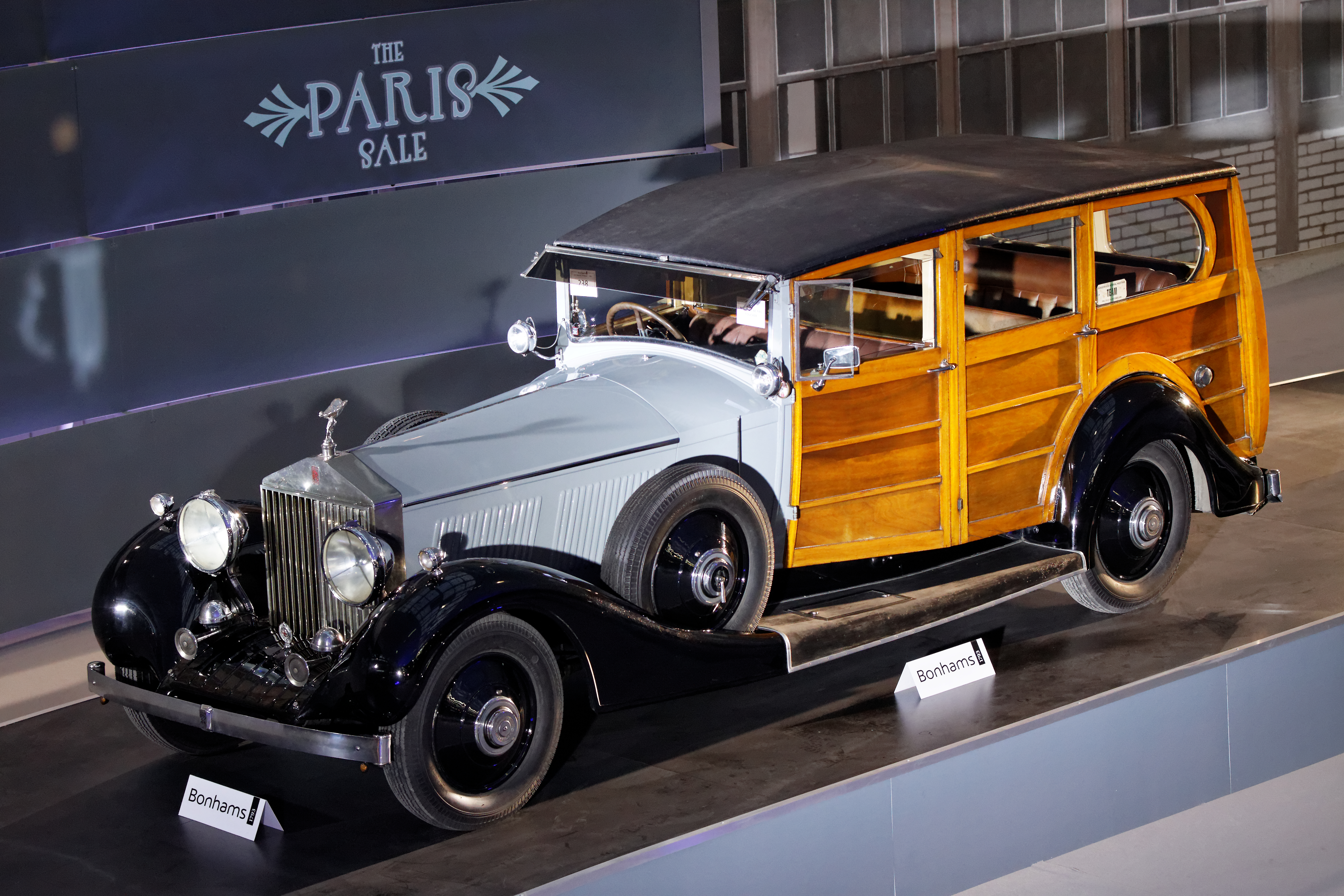
1928 Rolls-Royce Phantom I with woodie coachwork fitted in the 1940s

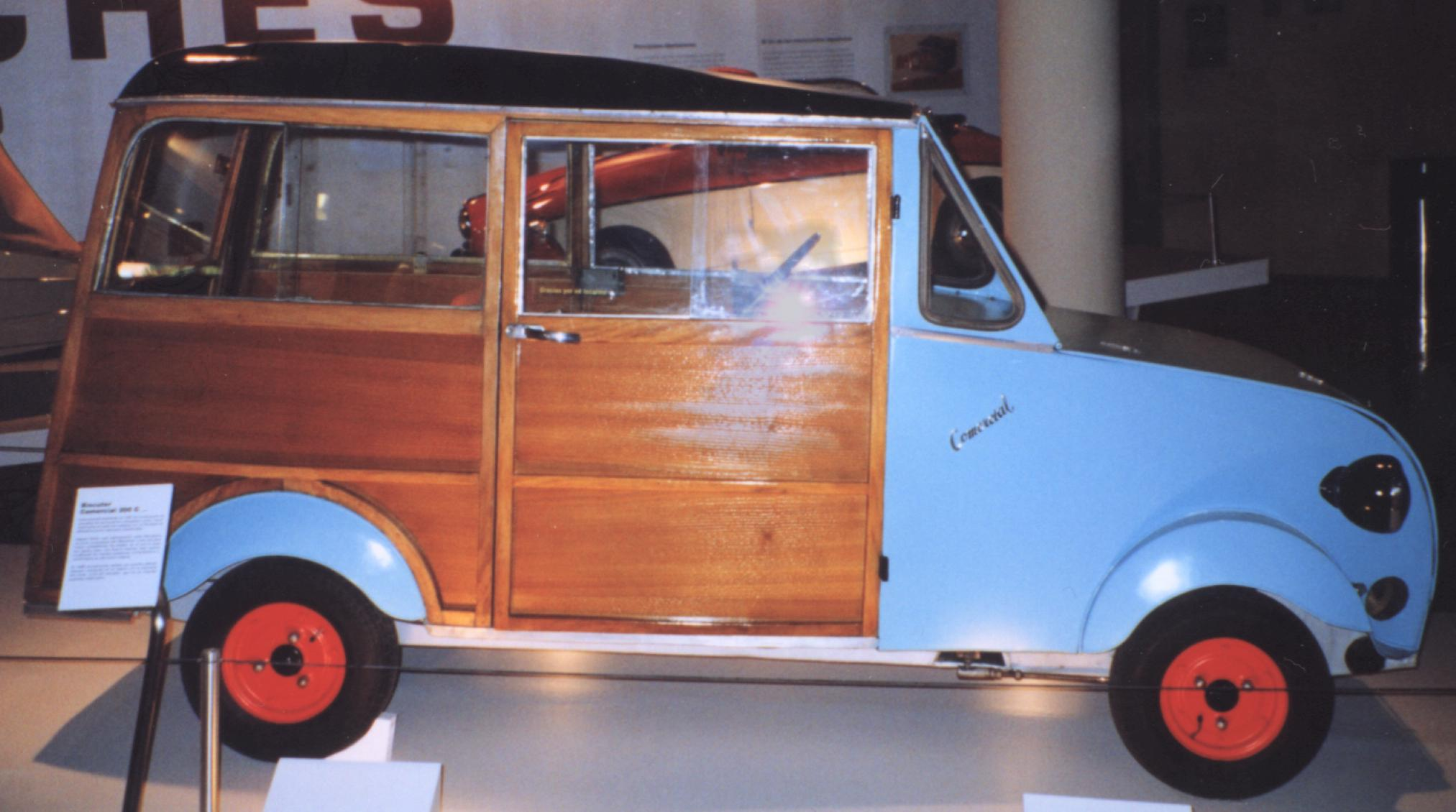
The Biscúter Comercial 200C (Spanish)

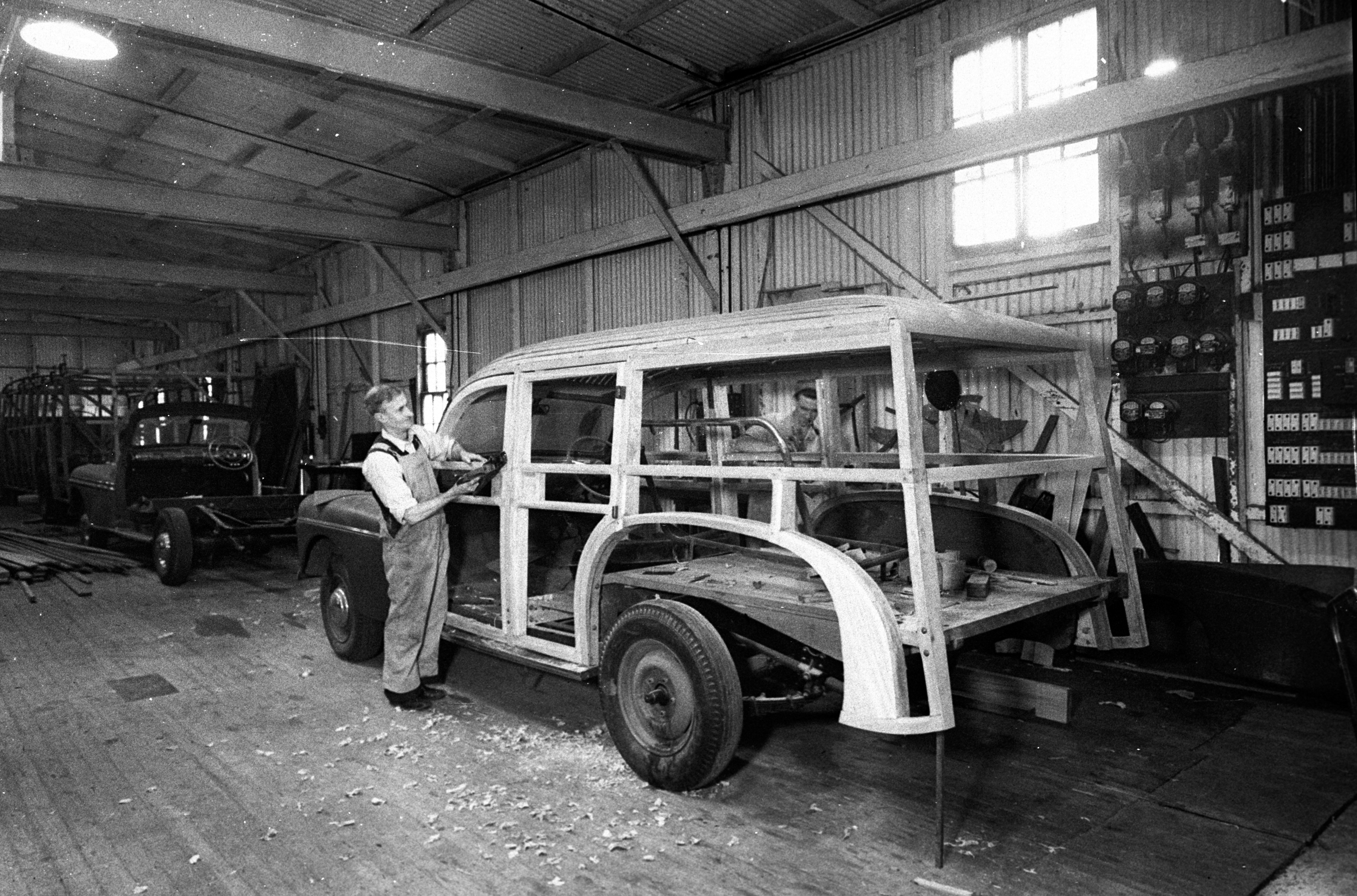
Construction of wooden-framed station wagon body, 1947, Australia

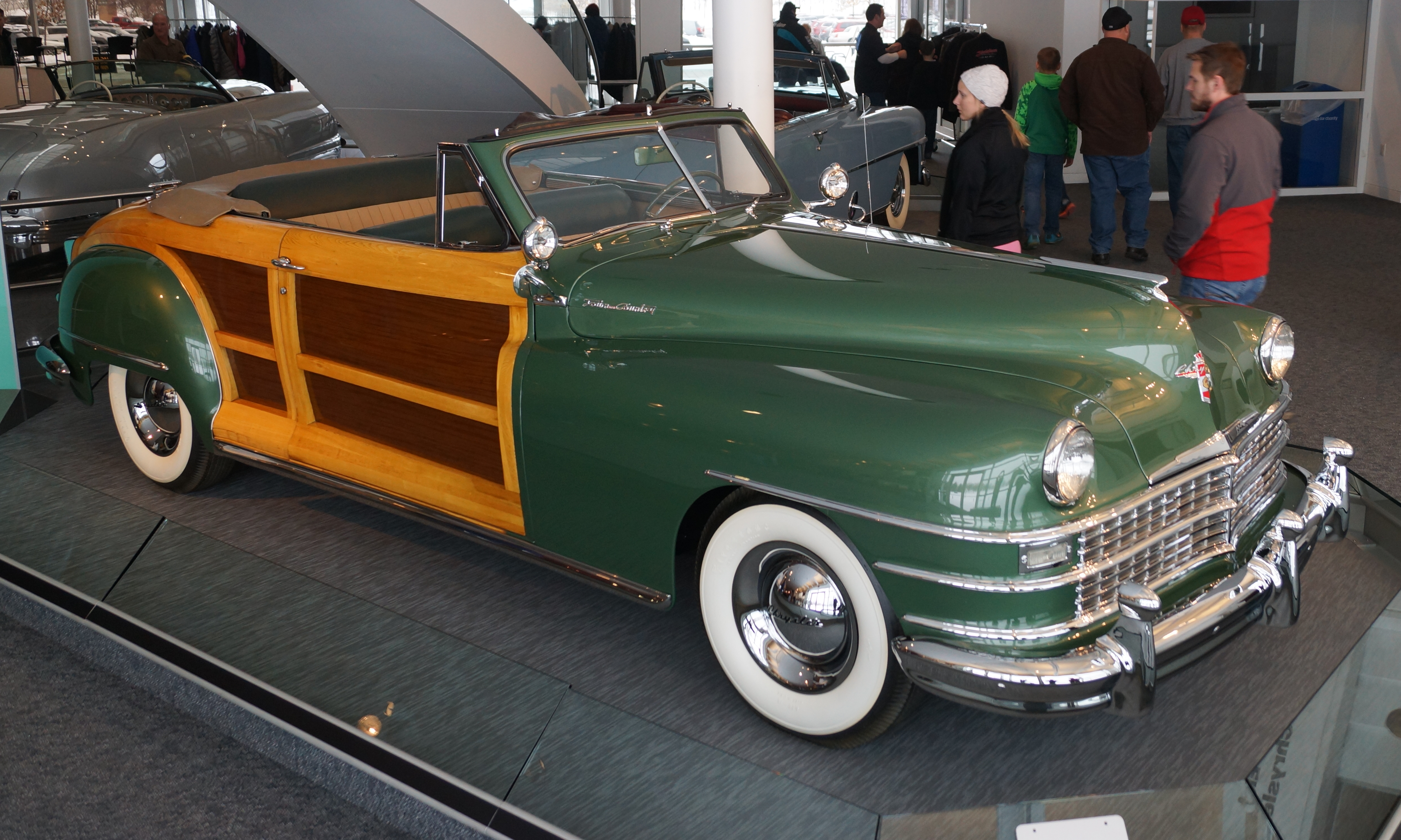
1948 Chrysler Town and Country, a convertible woodie

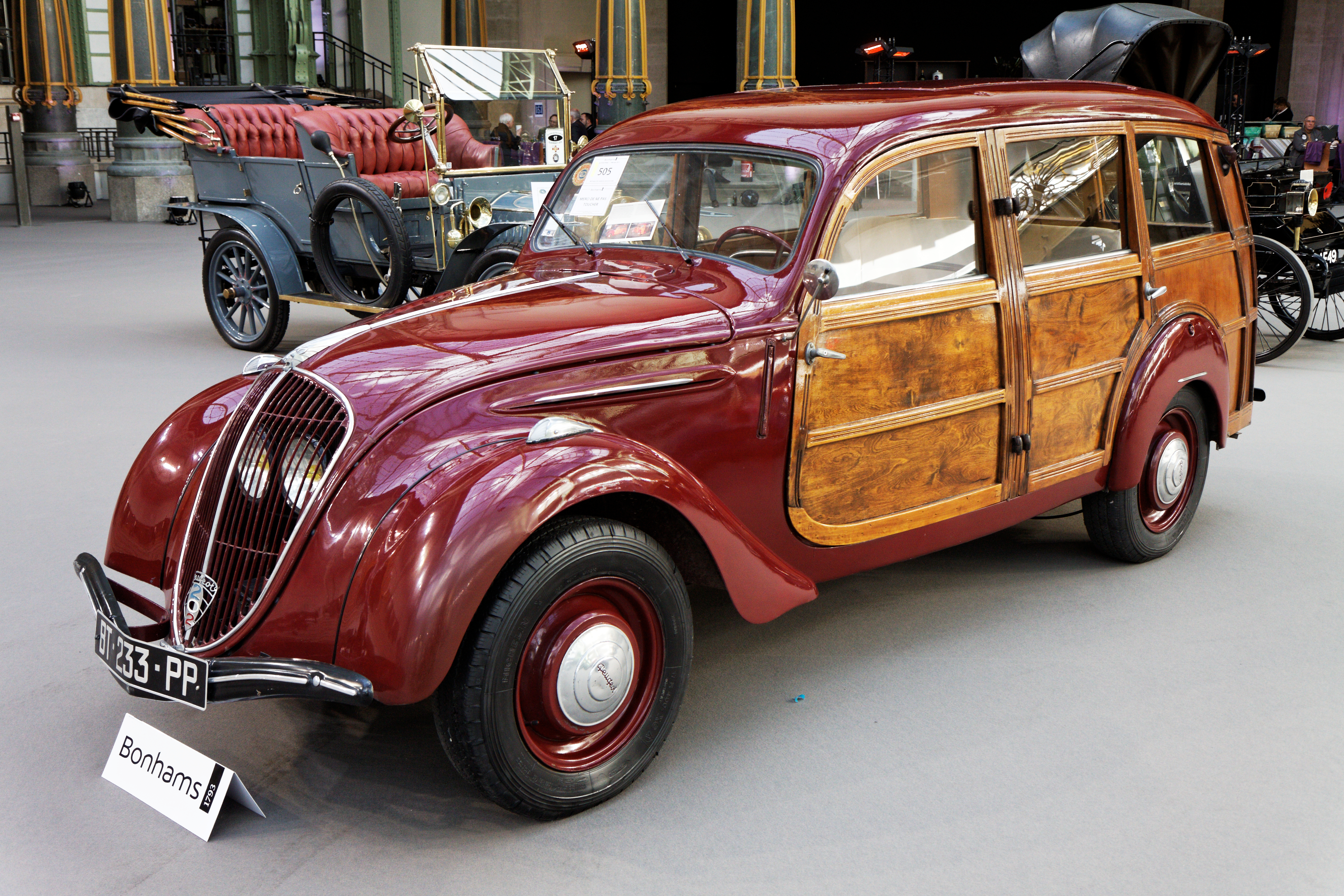
1948 Peugeot 202 Canadienne woodie

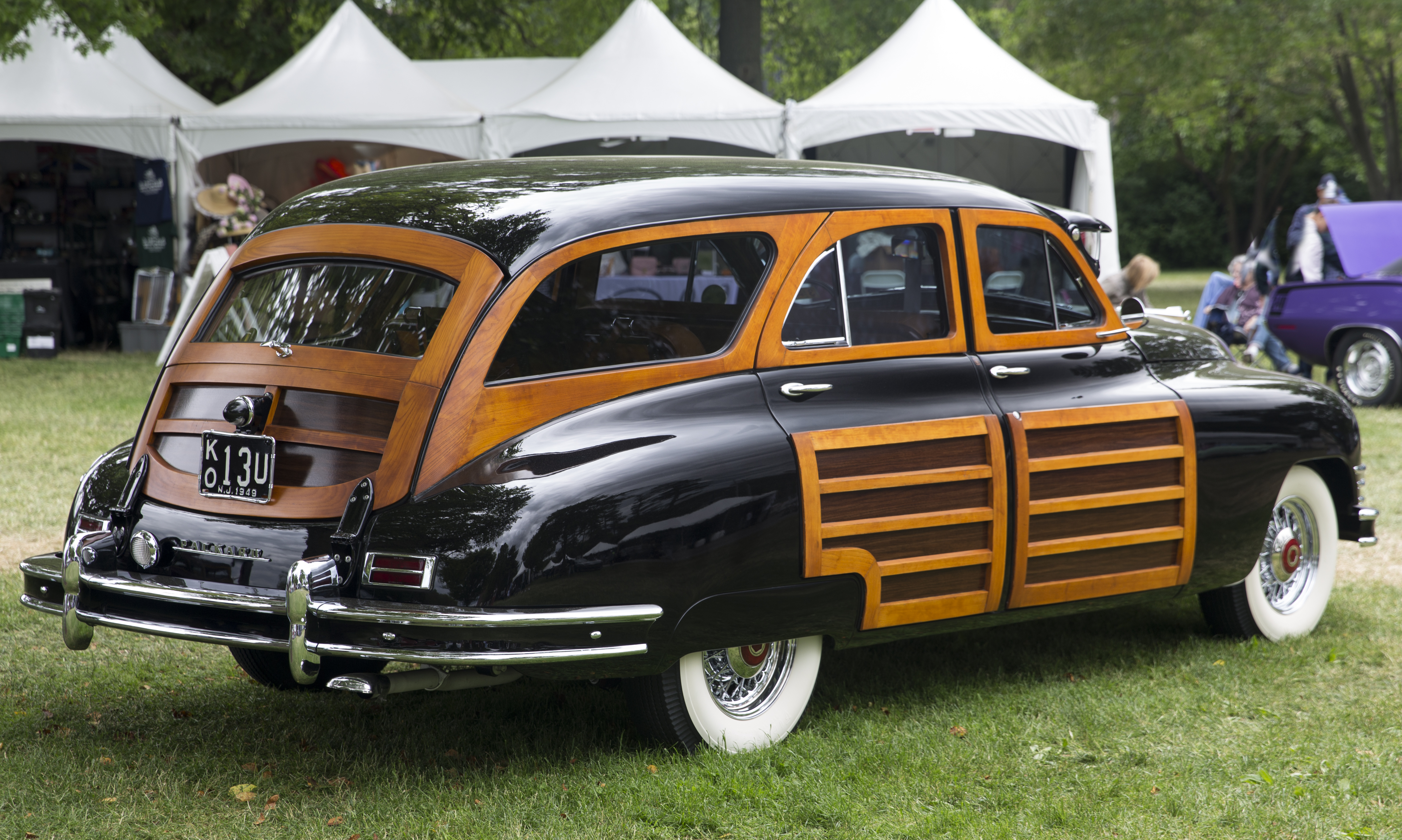
1949 Packard Station Sedan

=== 1950s and 1960s ===
In 1950, Chrysler discontinued their woodie station wagons on DeSoto, Dodge and Plymouth station wagons. Buick's 1953 Super Estate Wagon and 1953 Roadmaster Estate Wagon were the last production American station wagons to retain real wood construction. Other marques by then were touting the advantages of "all-steel" construction to the buying public. By 1955, only Ford and Mercury, joined in 1965 by Chrysler, offered a "woodie" appearance – evoking real wood with other materials including steel, plastics and DI-NOC (a vinyl product). As the appearance became popular, Ford, GM, and Chrysler offered multiple models with the woodgrain appearance until the early 1990s.

The British Motor Corporation (BMC) offered the Morris Minor Traveller (1953–1971) with wood structural components and painted aluminium infill panels – the last true mass-produced woodie. Morris' subsequent Mini Traveller (1961–1969) employed steel infill panels and faux wood structural members.

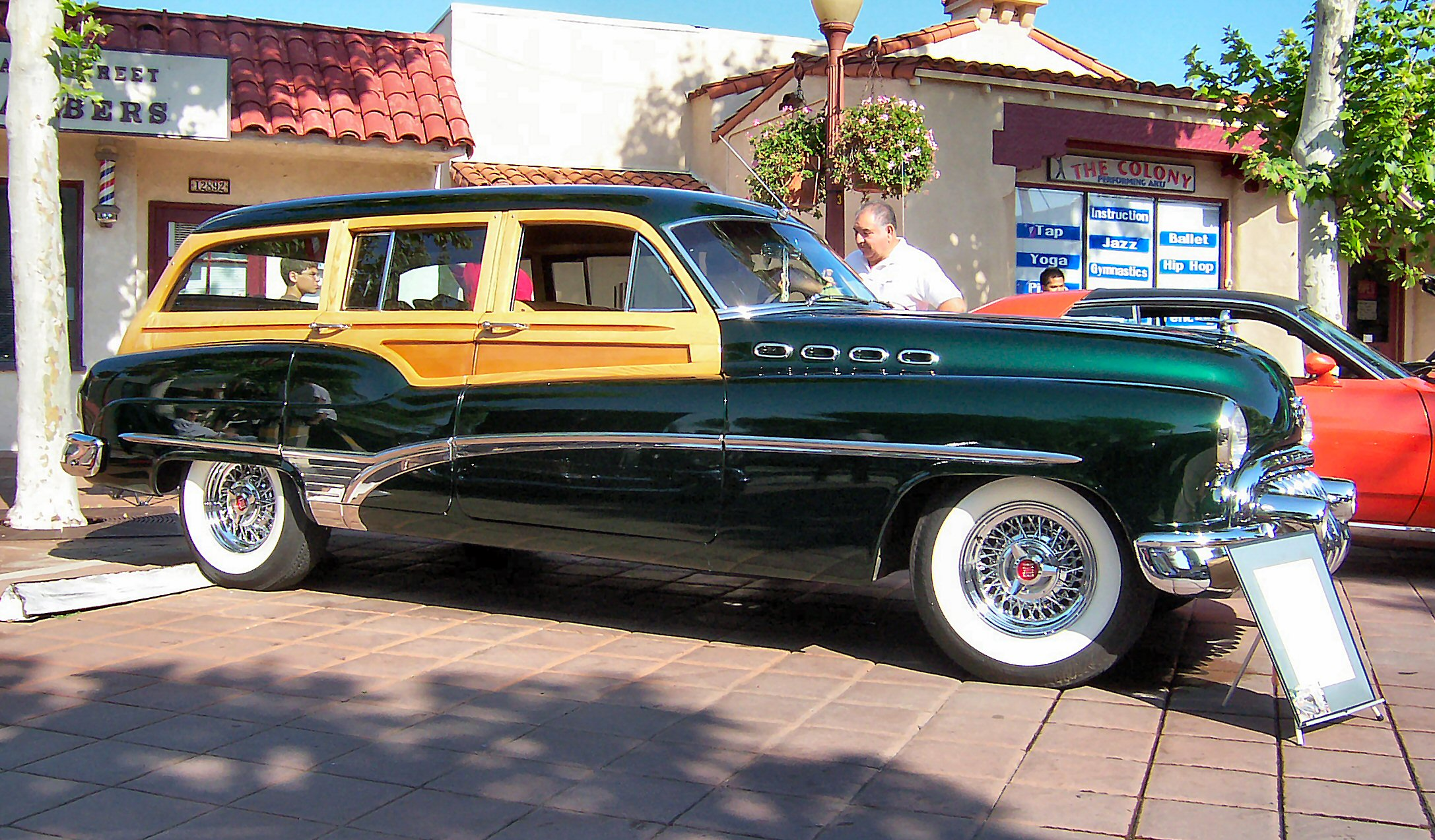
1950 Buick Roadmaster

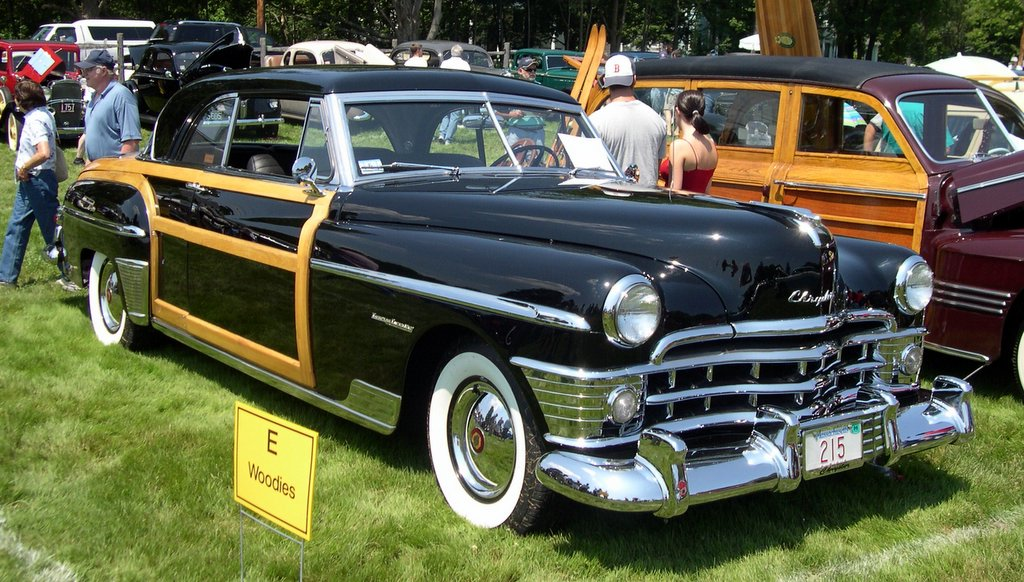
1950 Chrysler Newport Town & Country convertible

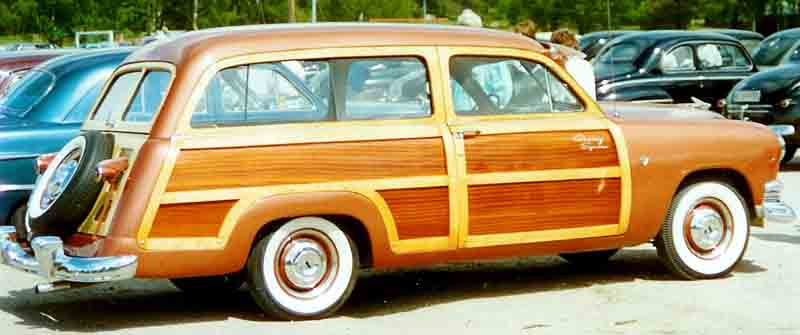
1951 Ford Custom 79 Country Squire

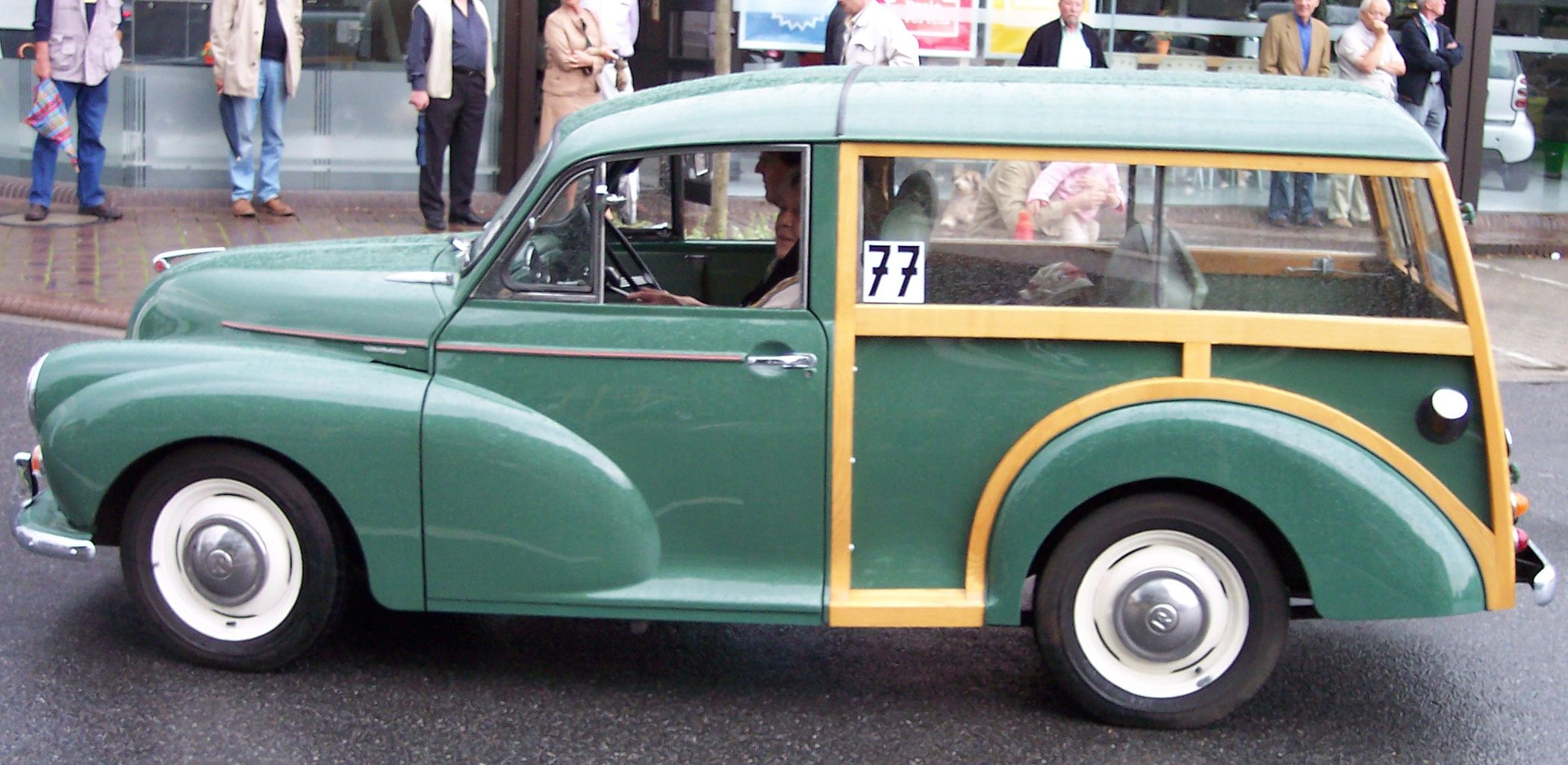
1960s Morris Minor 1000 Traveller

== Simulated woodgrain ==
After the demise of models using actual wood construction, manufacturers continued to evoke wood construction with sheet-vinyl appliques of simulated wood grain, sometimes augmented with three-dimensional, simulated framework, and later by a simple series of indented grooves in the bodywork.

The 1966 Chevrolet Caprice in its second season, added to the four-door hardtop body style a full line of models including a vinyl-wood trimmed station wagon, the Caprice Estate. Dodge also reintroduced simulated wood the same year.

Ford marketed the Ford Pinto Squire with vinyl simulated wood trim in the early 1970s. When Chevrolet proposed a simulated woodgrain option for the Chevy Vega Kammback wagon for the 1973 model year, after a gap of four years of applying woodgrain film on the Caprice, the Vega's production schedule made smooth application of the applique difficult without wrinkles and heavy scrappage – requiring retraining by the film supplier, 3M. Subsequent rebadged variants of the Vega (marketed as "Woody"), including the Pontiac Astre Safari, Chevrolet Monza Estate and Pontiac Sunbird Safari, also offered simulated wood trim. Chevrolet offered a simulated woodie version of the Chevette in 1976, and AMC offered the Pacer wagon with optional simulated wood trim in 1977.

Ford also marketed version of their Ranchero model, a coupe utility produced between 1957 and 1979 with an open bed like a pickup truck but from a station wagon platform, with simulated woodgrain siding. In 1973, Ford produced a minivan prototype that offered a woodgrain appearance to preceded the Chrysler minivan, called the Ford Carousel, but it was not put into production. The 1973–1976 Chevrolet El Camino Estate, 1973–1977 Chevrolet Suburban, 1977–1979 Volkswagen Rabbit, and 1970–1991 Jeep Wagoneer had simulated woodgrain siding.

Introduced in 1981, the Ford Escort and Mercury Lynx four-door wagons offered optional simulated wood trim. GM offered its full-size wagons in wood trim versions until their final year in 1996. From 1982 to 1988, Chrysler used the Town & Country name on a station wagon version of the K-based, front wheel drive LeBaron, featuring plastic woodgrain exterior trim with three dimensional simulated framework. As the station wagon declined in North America, manufacturers offered faux wood trim on SUVs and minivans (e.g., the Jeep Cherokee and Chrysler minivans). Chrysler offered simulated wood as an option for the Chrysler PT Cruiser, introduced in 2000 – and aftermarket firms offered kits as well.

Japanese carmakers shied away from the appearance apart from port-of-entry or dealer-installed trim offered to North American consumers, although Mazda equipped the 1972–1977 Mazda Luce/RX-4 optionally, Honda briefly offered the 1980 Honda Civic station wagon, and Nissan offered the appearance on the 1983-1987 Nissan Cedric V20E SGL and Nissan Gloria V20E SGL top trim package station wagons to Japanese customers only.

In 2010, George Barris created a woodie version of the Smart Fortwo, an aftermarket firm offered a simulated wood kit for the same car, and GM displayed a prototype woodie version of the forthcoming Chevrolet Spark for the 2010 Paris Motor Show.

Introduced in 2008, the Ford Flex featured a series of side and rear horizontal grooves intended to evoke a woodie look – without either wood or simulated wood. Car Design News said the styling references "a previous era without resorting to obvious retro styling cues."

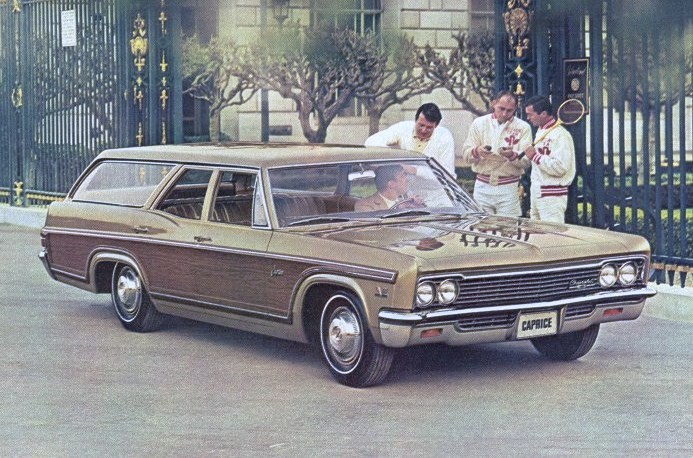
1966 Chevrolet Caprice Estate

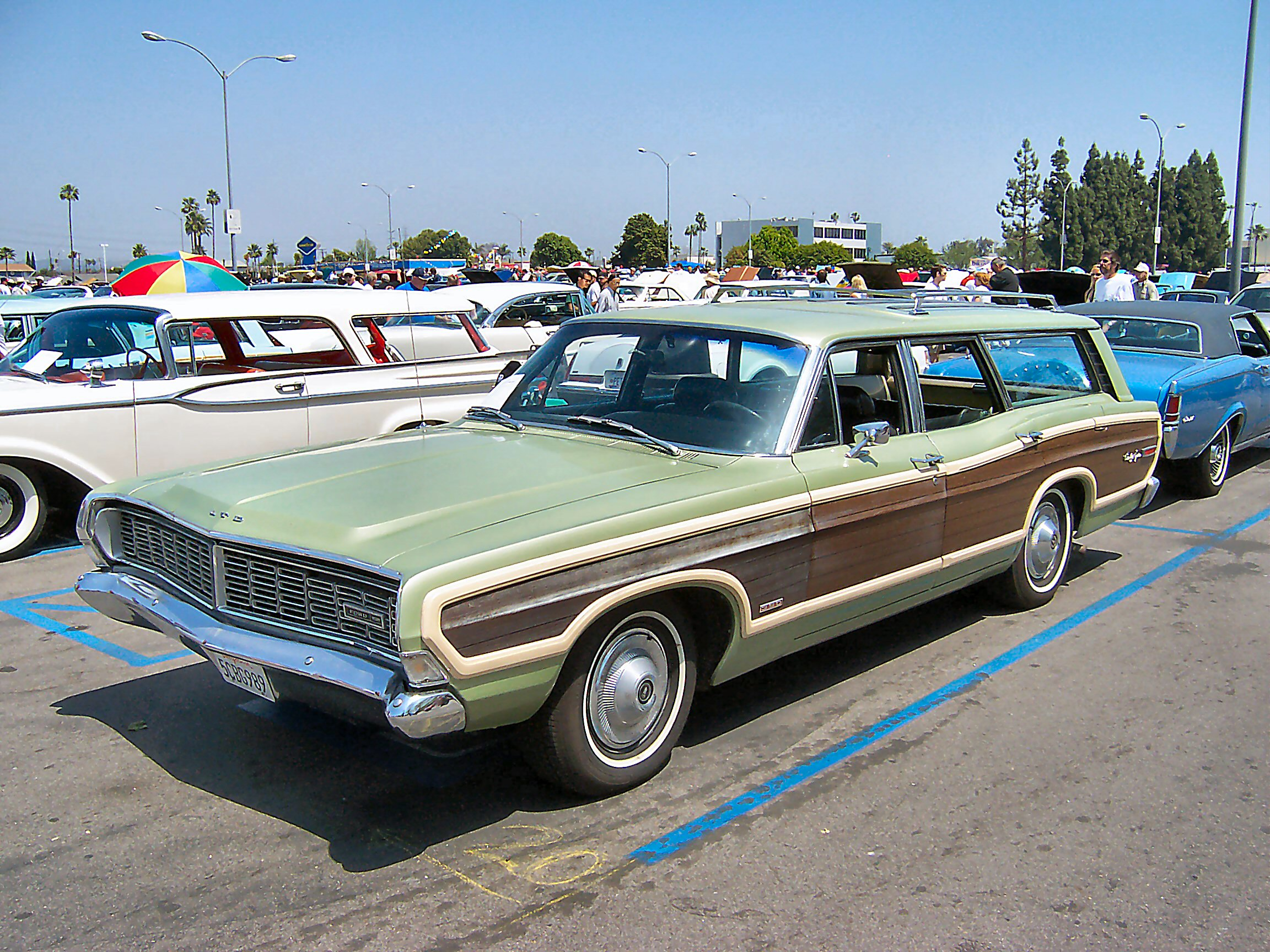
1968 Ford LTD Country Squire

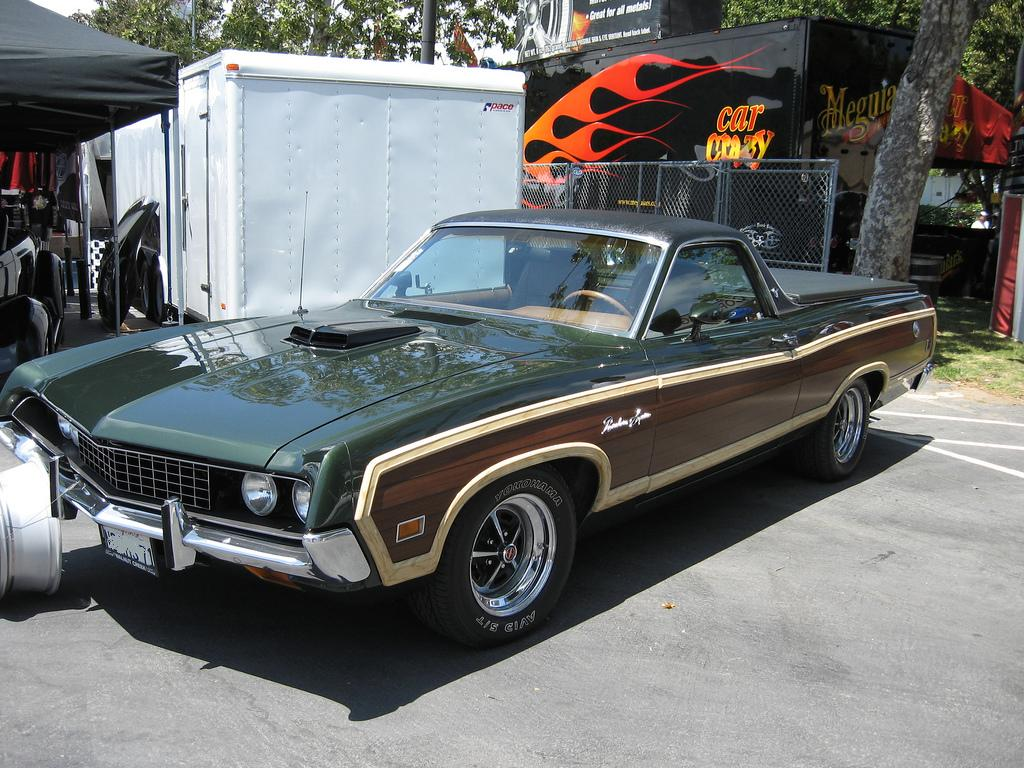
1970 Ford Ranchero Coupe utility

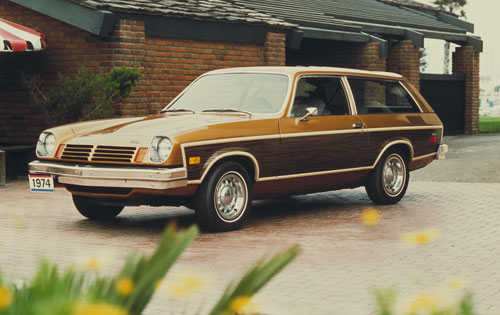
1974 Chevrolet Vega Estate

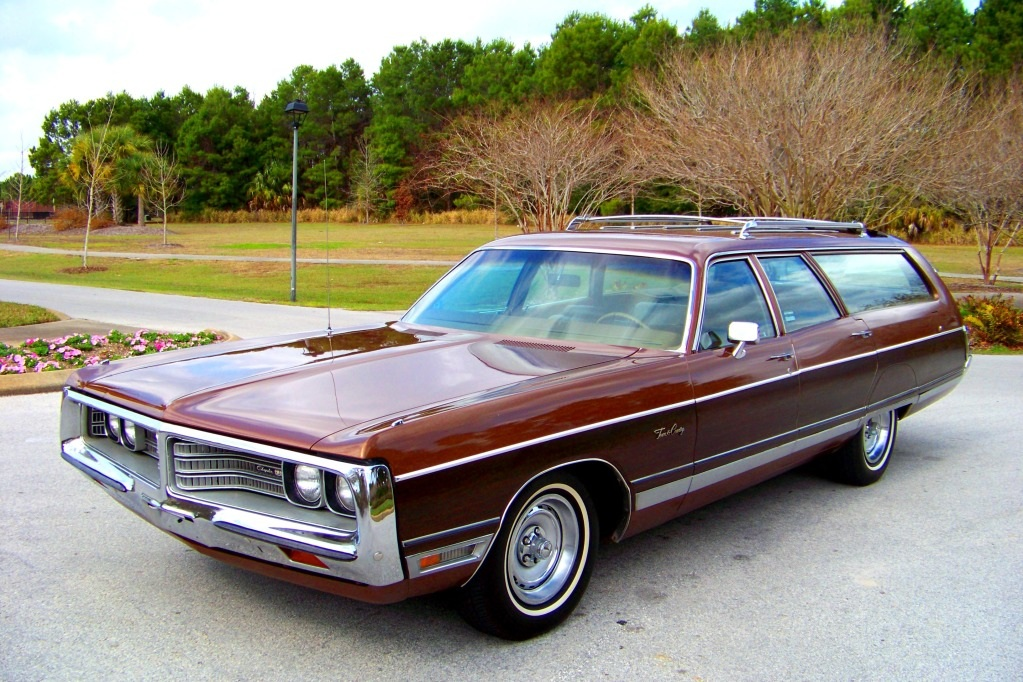
1972 Chrysler Town & Country

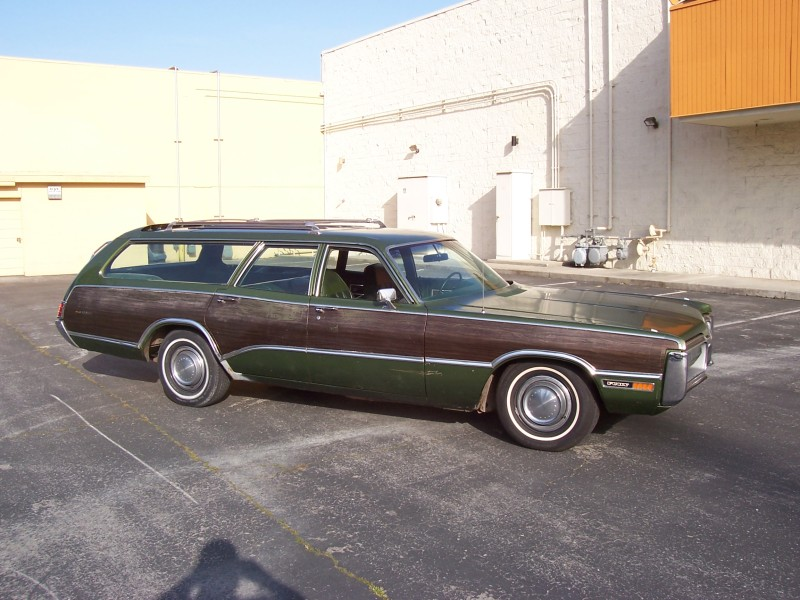
1972 Plymouth Fury Sport Suburban

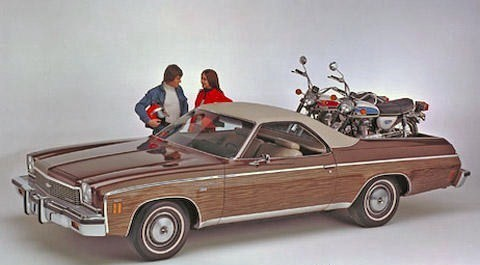
1973 Chevrolet El Camino Estate

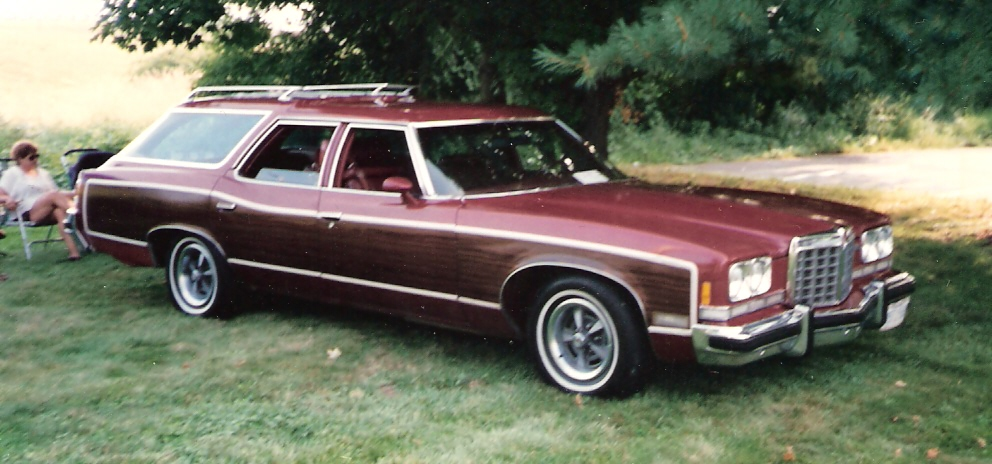
1974 Pontiac Grand Safari

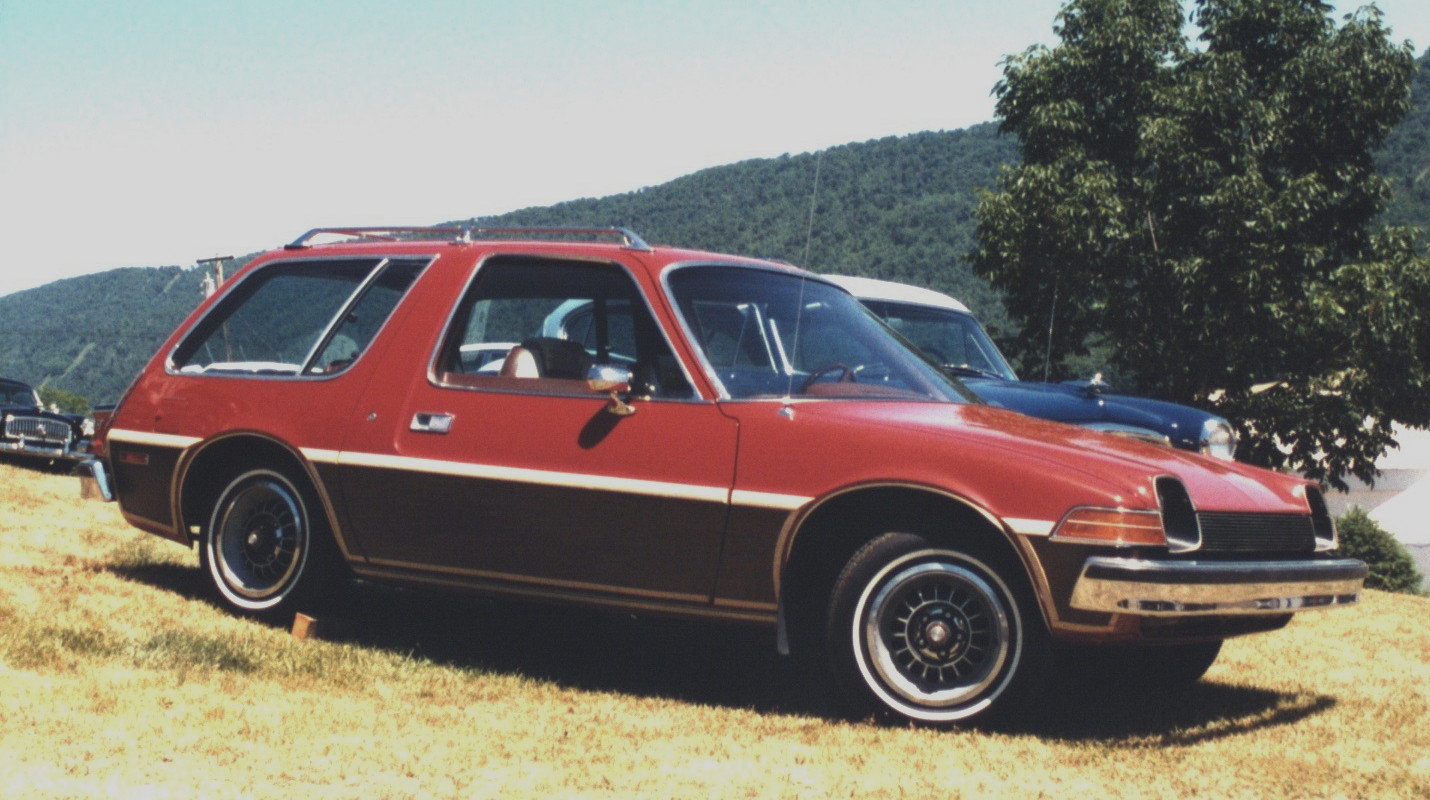
1977 American Motors Pacer

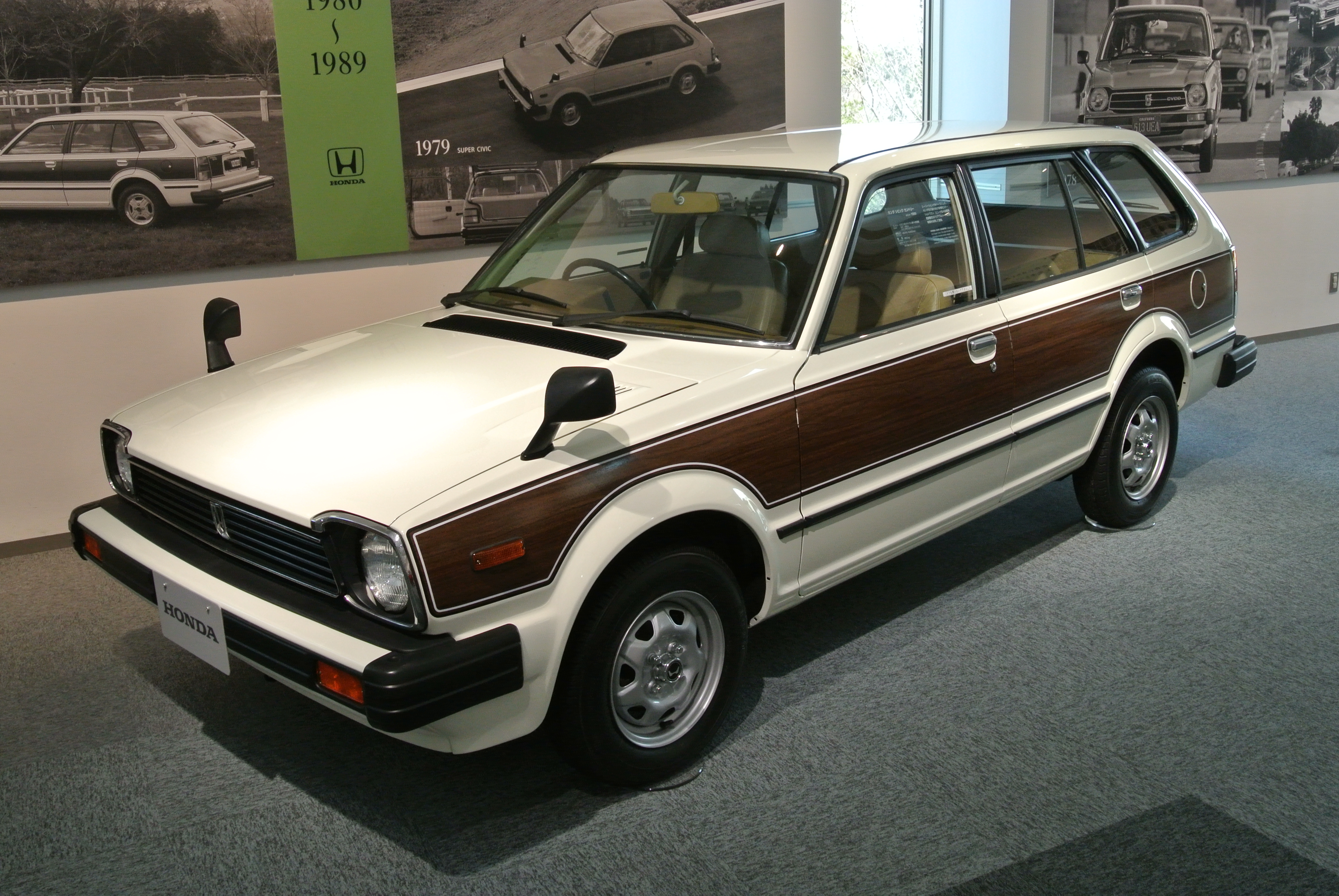
1980 Honda Civic Country

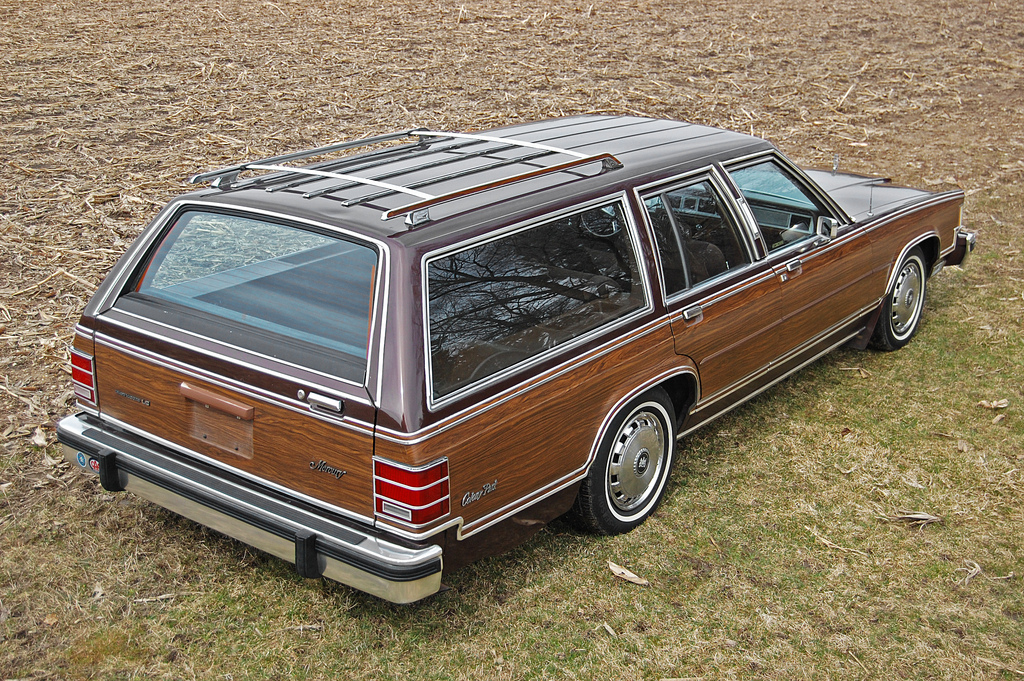
1984 Mercury Colony Park

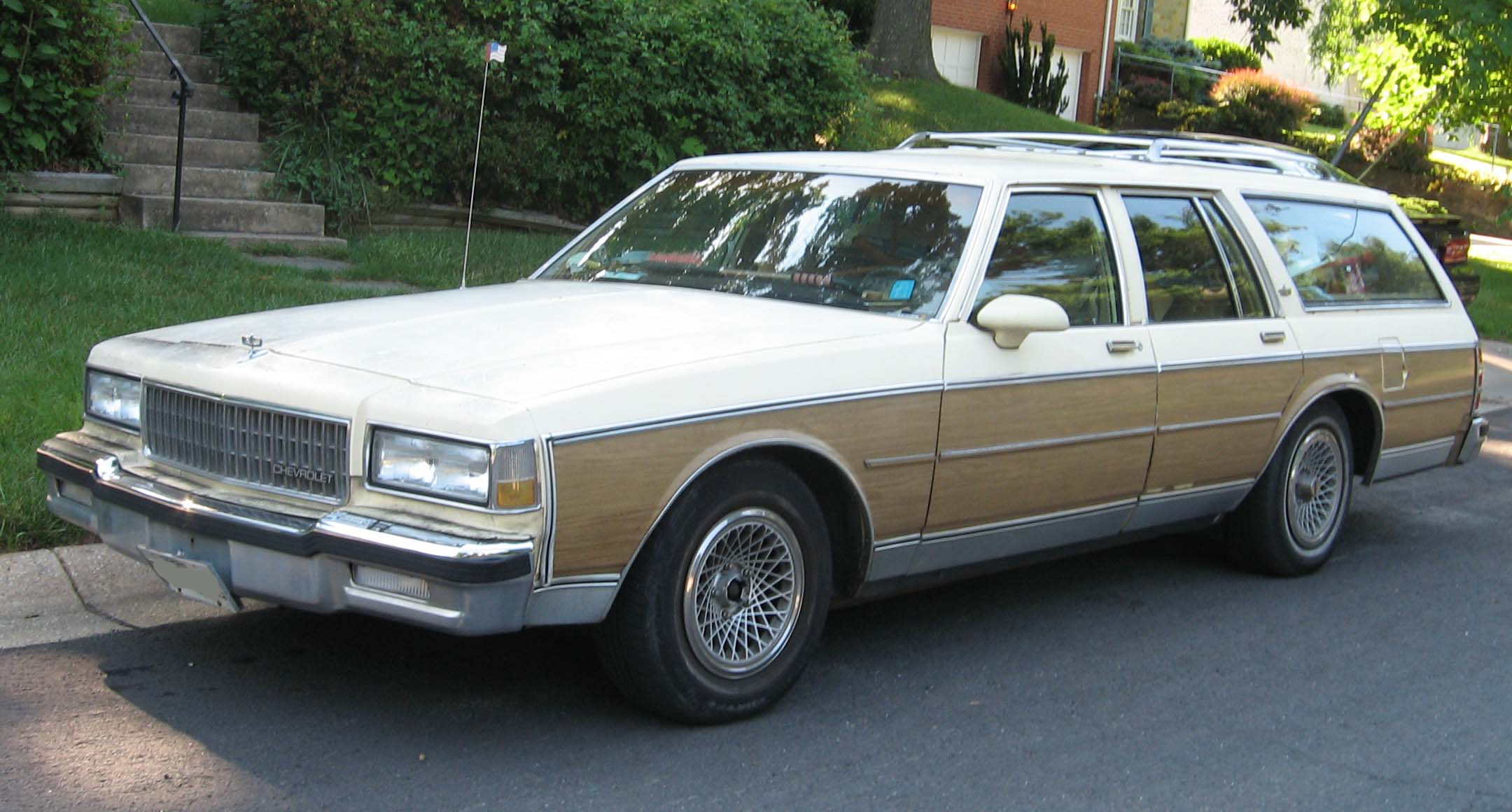
1988 Chevrolet Caprice Classic

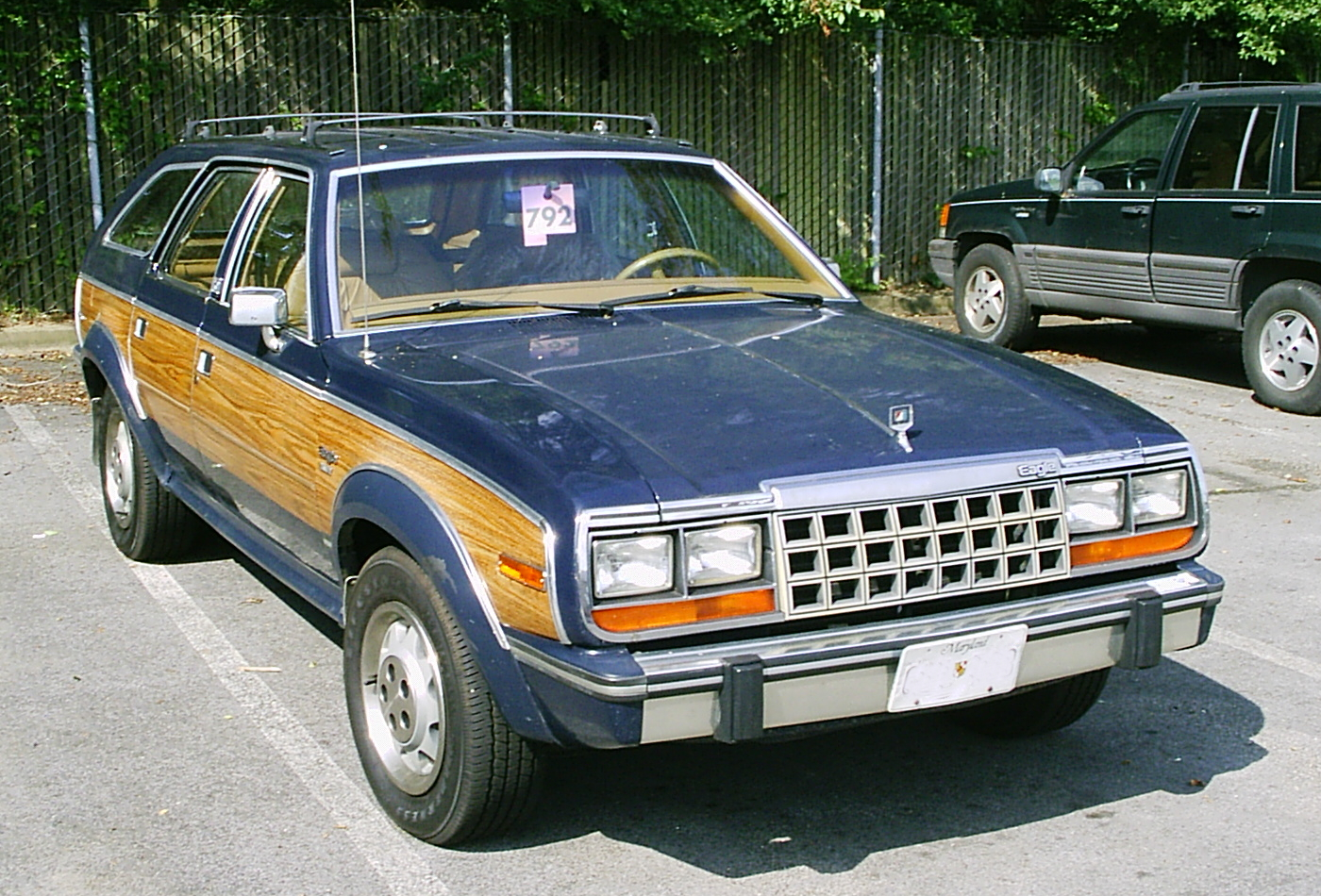
AMC Eagle

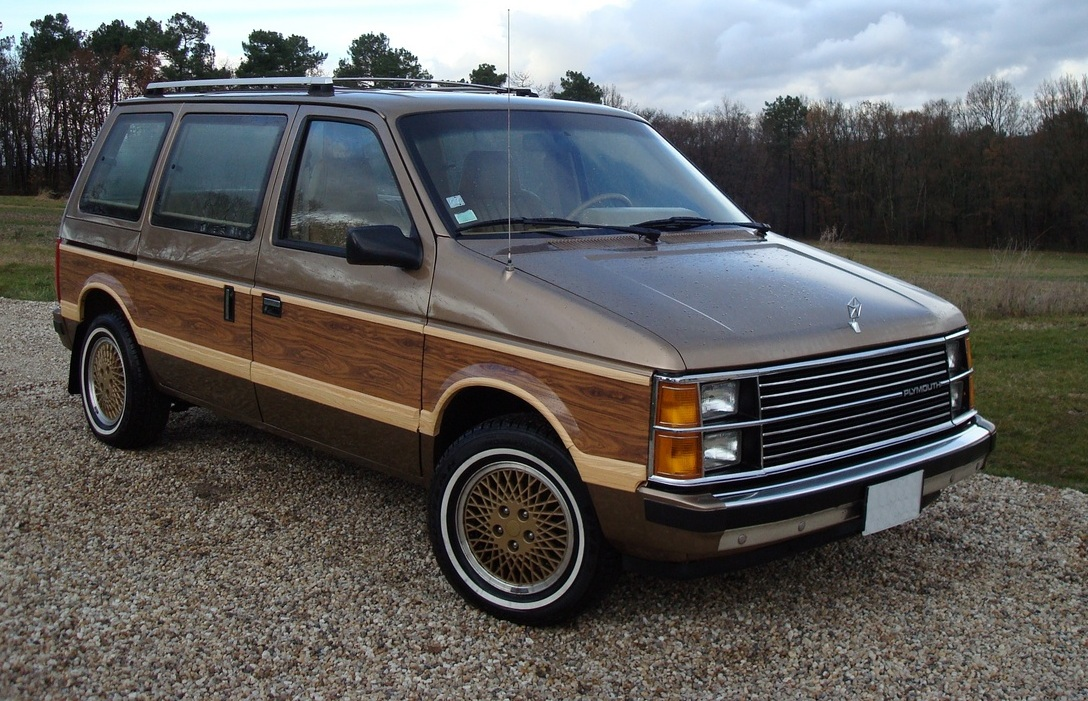
1985 Plymouth Voyager

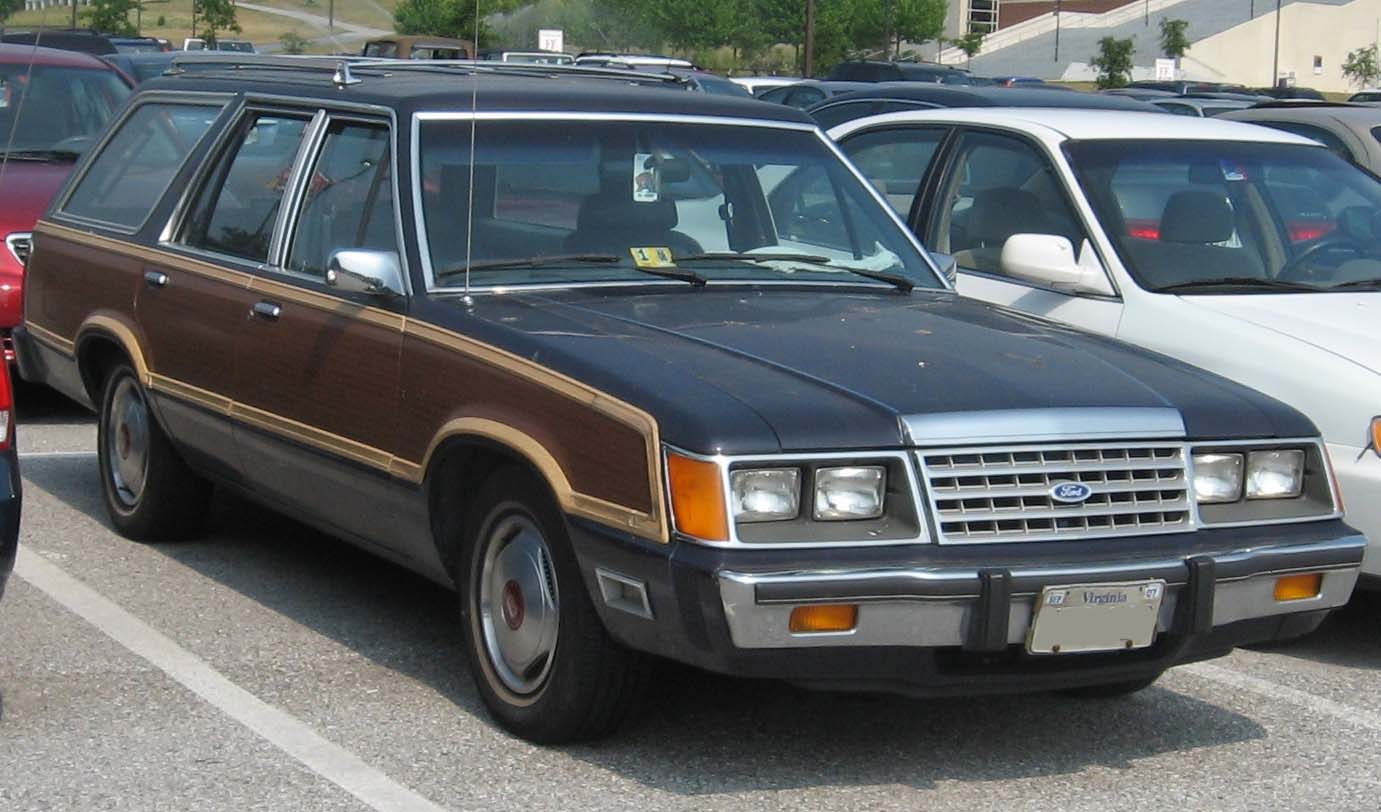
1986 Ford LTD

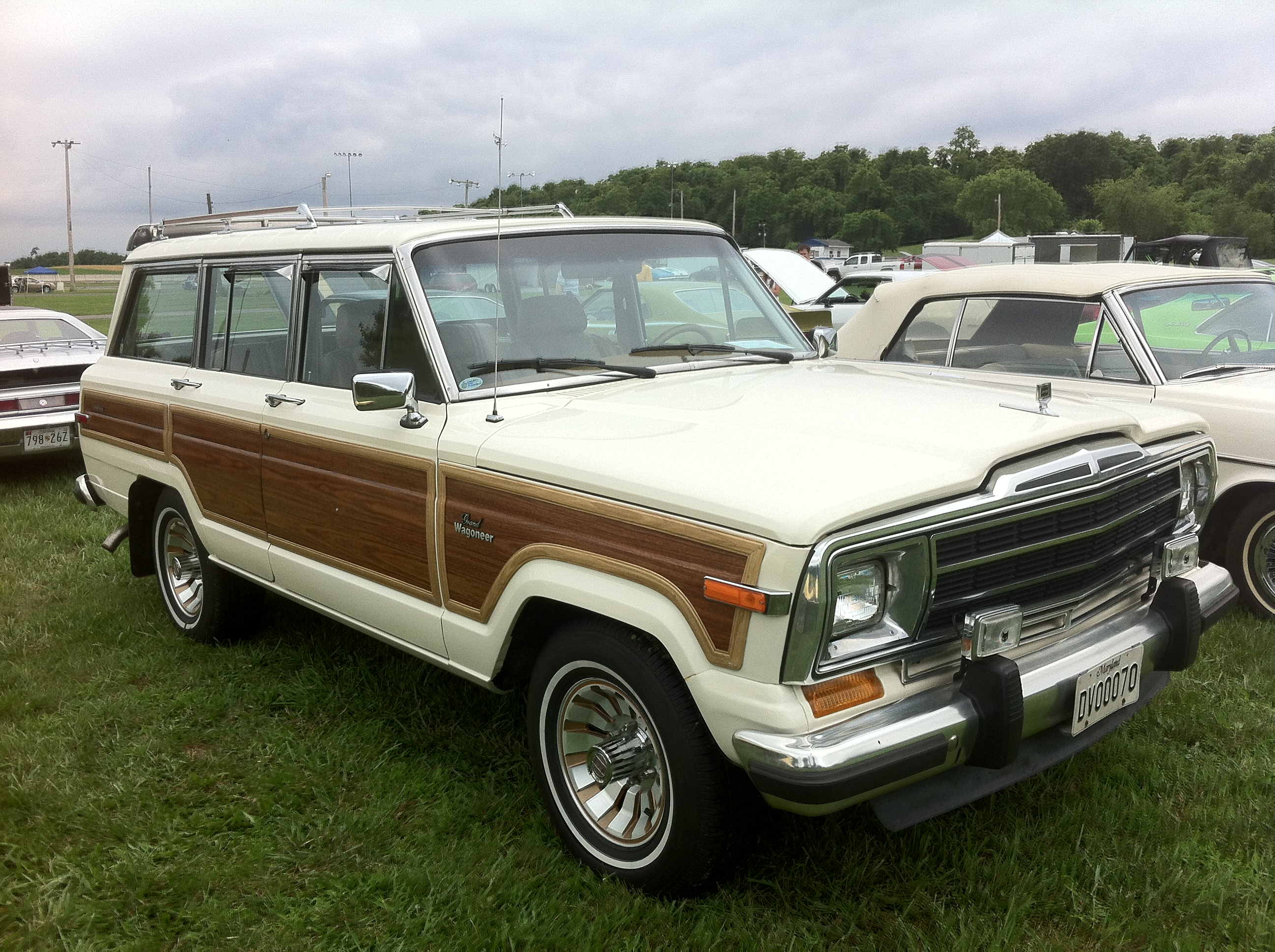
1986 Jeep Grand Wagoneer

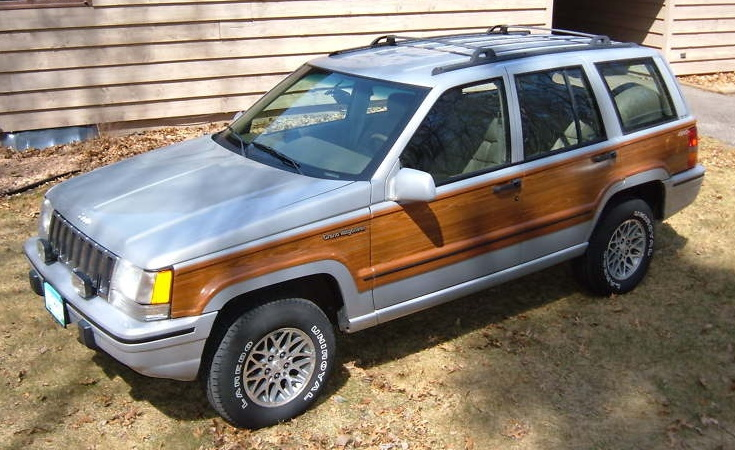
1993 Jeep Grand Wagoneer

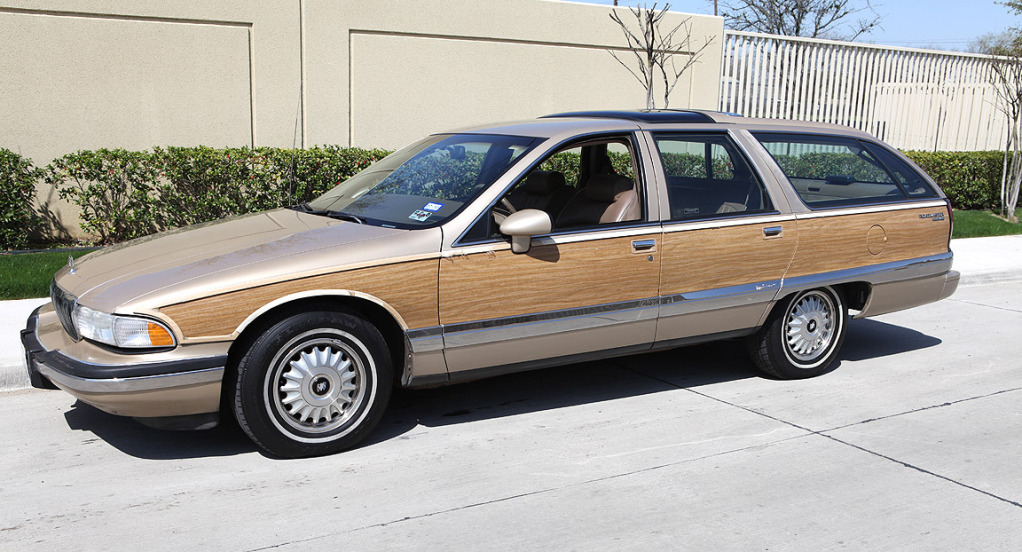
Buick Roadmaster Estate (1991-1996), the US' last full-sized station wagon

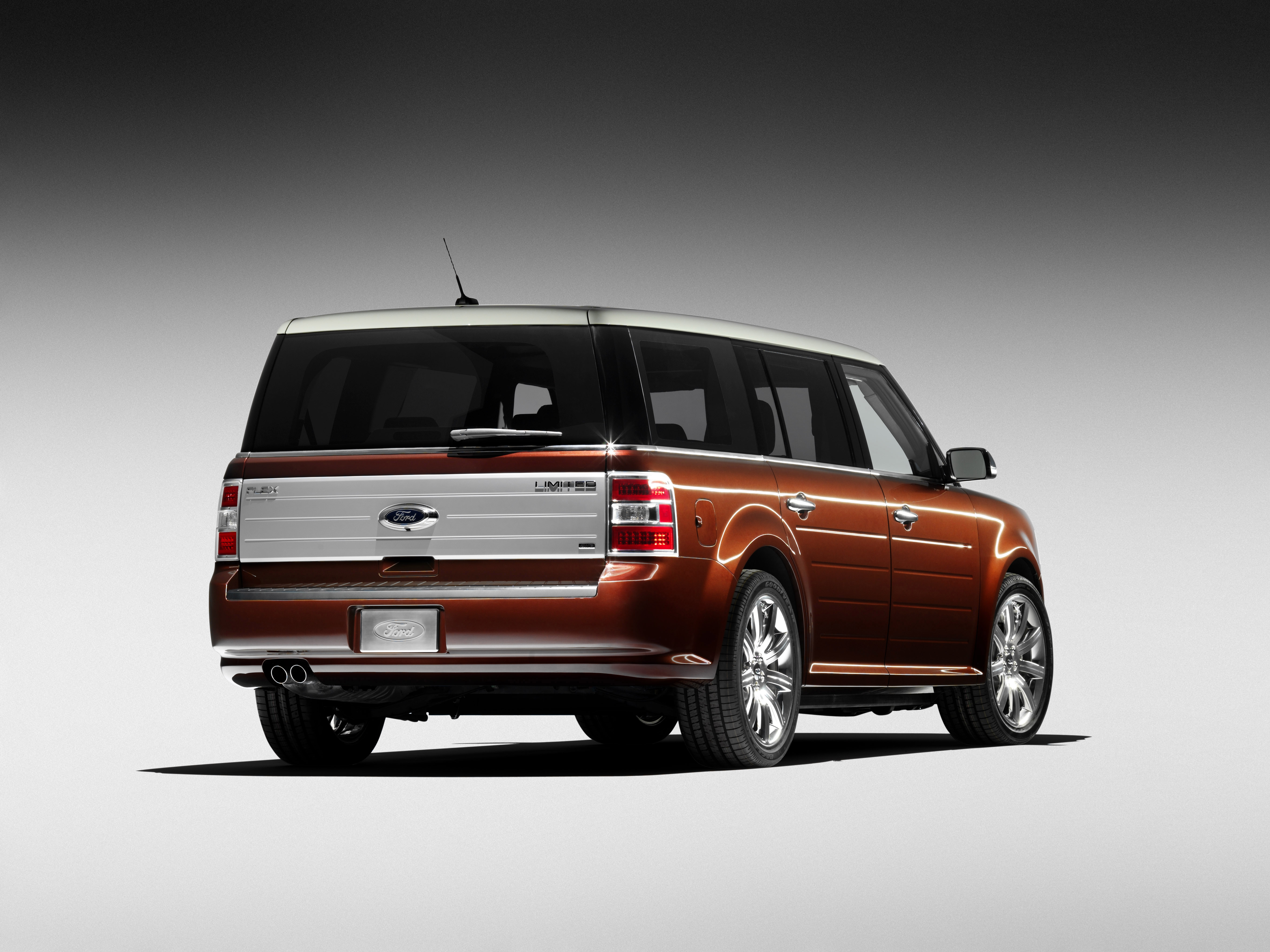
2009 Ford Flex with horizontal grooves to evoke wood

== Legacy ==
Columbia Pictures' top-grossing film for the 1940s, director John Stahl's 1945 Leave Her to Heaven starring Gene Tierney and Cornel Wilde, features a "woodie" station wagon early in the film. Many other American movies from the 1940s also feature woodies.

The woodie was also closely associated with surfers and Surf-rock, e.g., “I bought a ’34 wagon and we call it a woodie" from the classic "Surf City" by Jan and Dean or the 1963 instrumental "Boogie Woodie" by The Beach Boys.

In 1995, the U.S. Postal Service issued a 15 cent stamp commemorating the woodie wagon.

== See also ==
- Station wagon
- Shooting-brake
- Surf culture
- Wood trim
