= Biscuter Pegasin =

Biscúter Pegasín
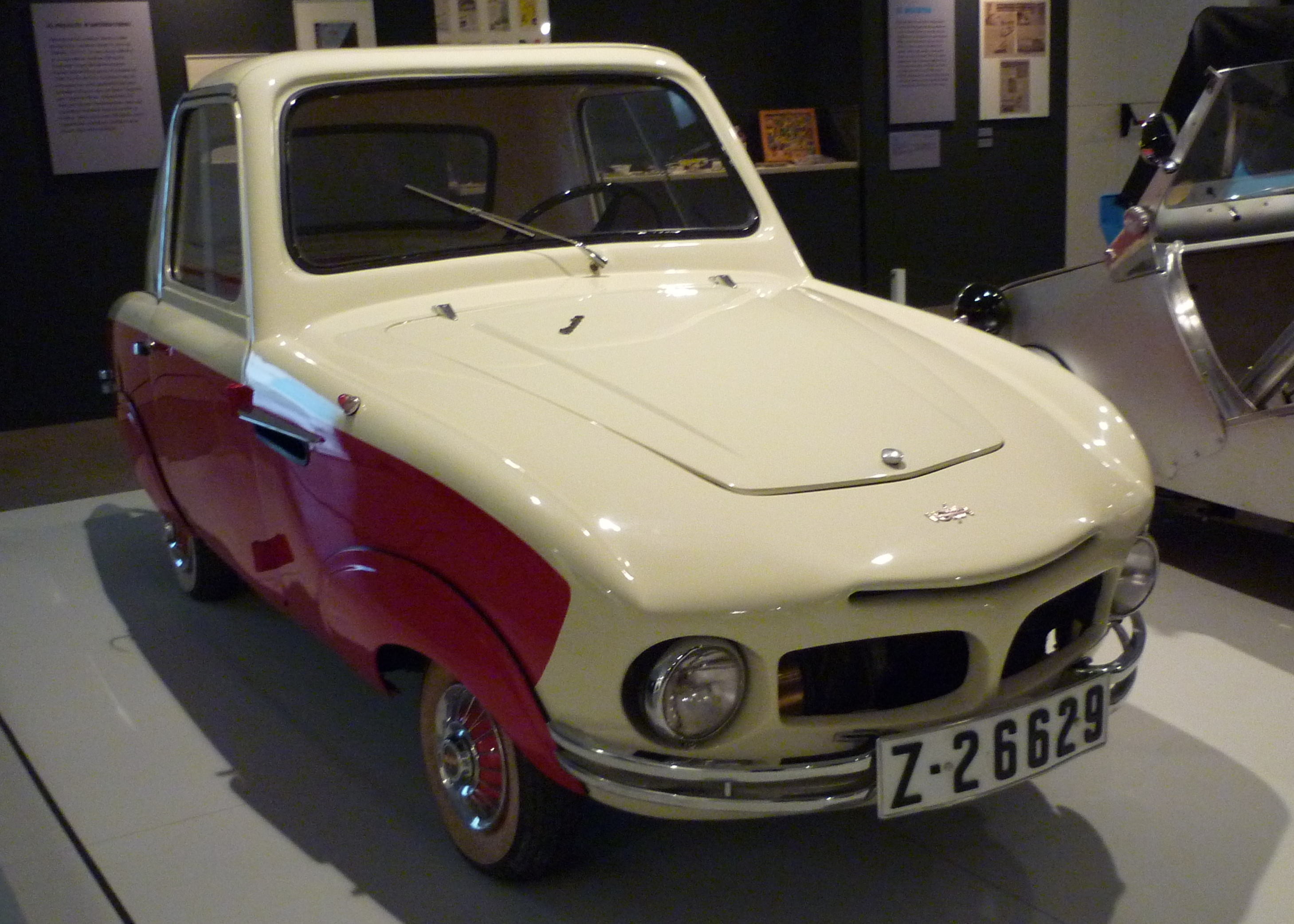

Overview
- Manufacturer: Autonacional
- Also called: Biscúter 200-F
- Production: 1957–1960

Body and chassis
- Class: Roadster, microcar
- Body style: Cabriolet
- Layout: Front-engine, front-wheel-drive

Powertrain
- Engine: 197 cc 9 hp (6.7 kW) single-cylinder 2-stroke Hispano-Villiers
- Transmission: 3-speed

Dimensions
- Length: 2,900 mm (110 in)
- Width: 1,260 mm (50 in)
- Curb weight: 240 kg (530 lb)

The Biscúter Pegasín (also known as the Biscúter 200-F) is a microcar from Autonacional. It was revealed in 1957 in an attempt to attract the wealthier buyers. It was more upscale than the very basic Biscúter and it had two-colour plastic body, hard- and soft-top. The styling was similar to the Pegaso Z-102. It was powered by a Hispano-Villiers, 197 cc two-stroke, single-cylinder 9 hp (7 kW) engine, giving it a top speed of 75 km/h (47 mph). By the early 1960s, Biscúter sales and production stopped, after a total production run of about 12,000. It is thought that most of the cars were eventually scrapped.

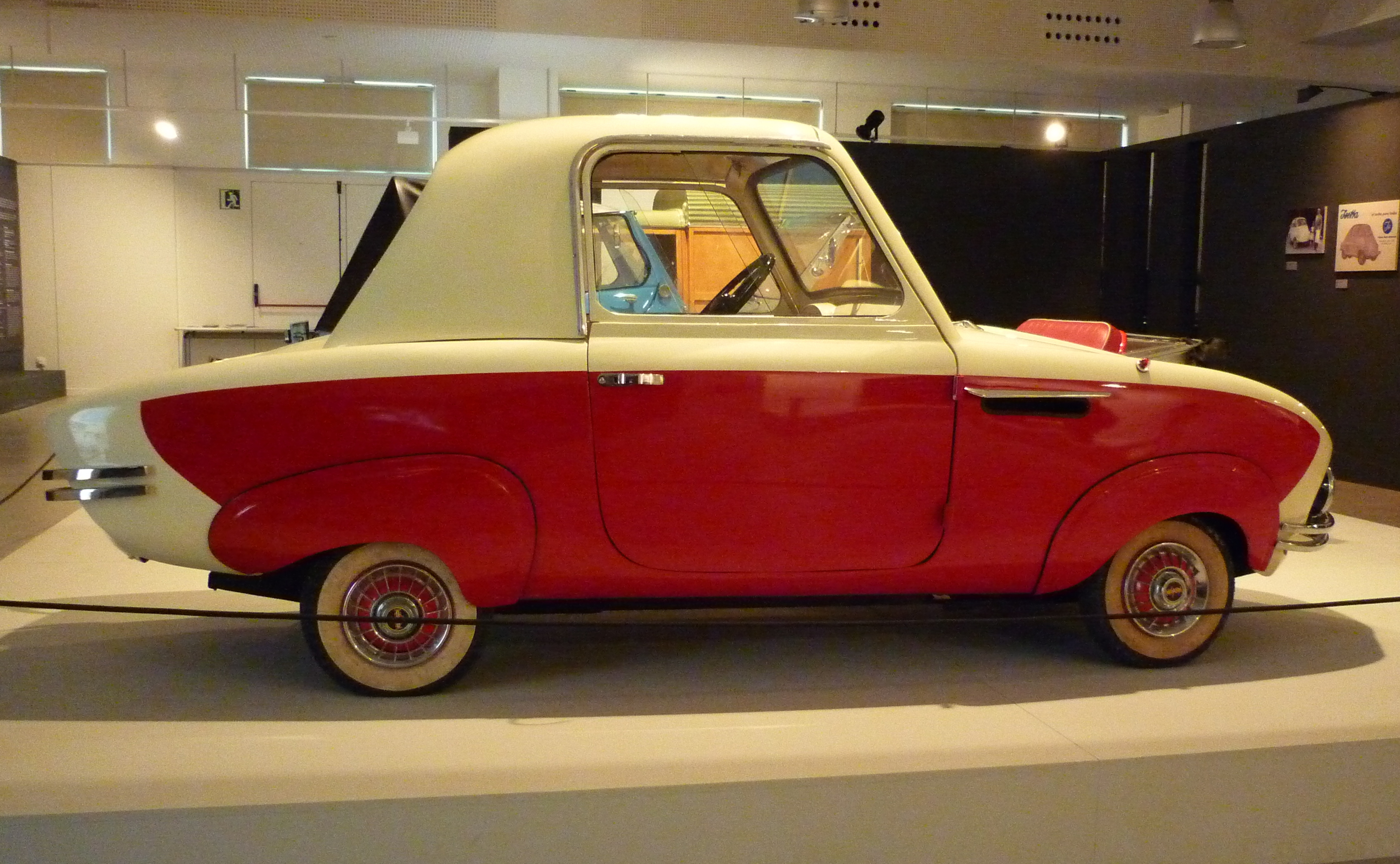
Side view
