= Biscúter =

Spanish microcar

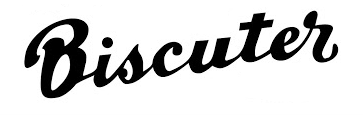
Biscúter logo

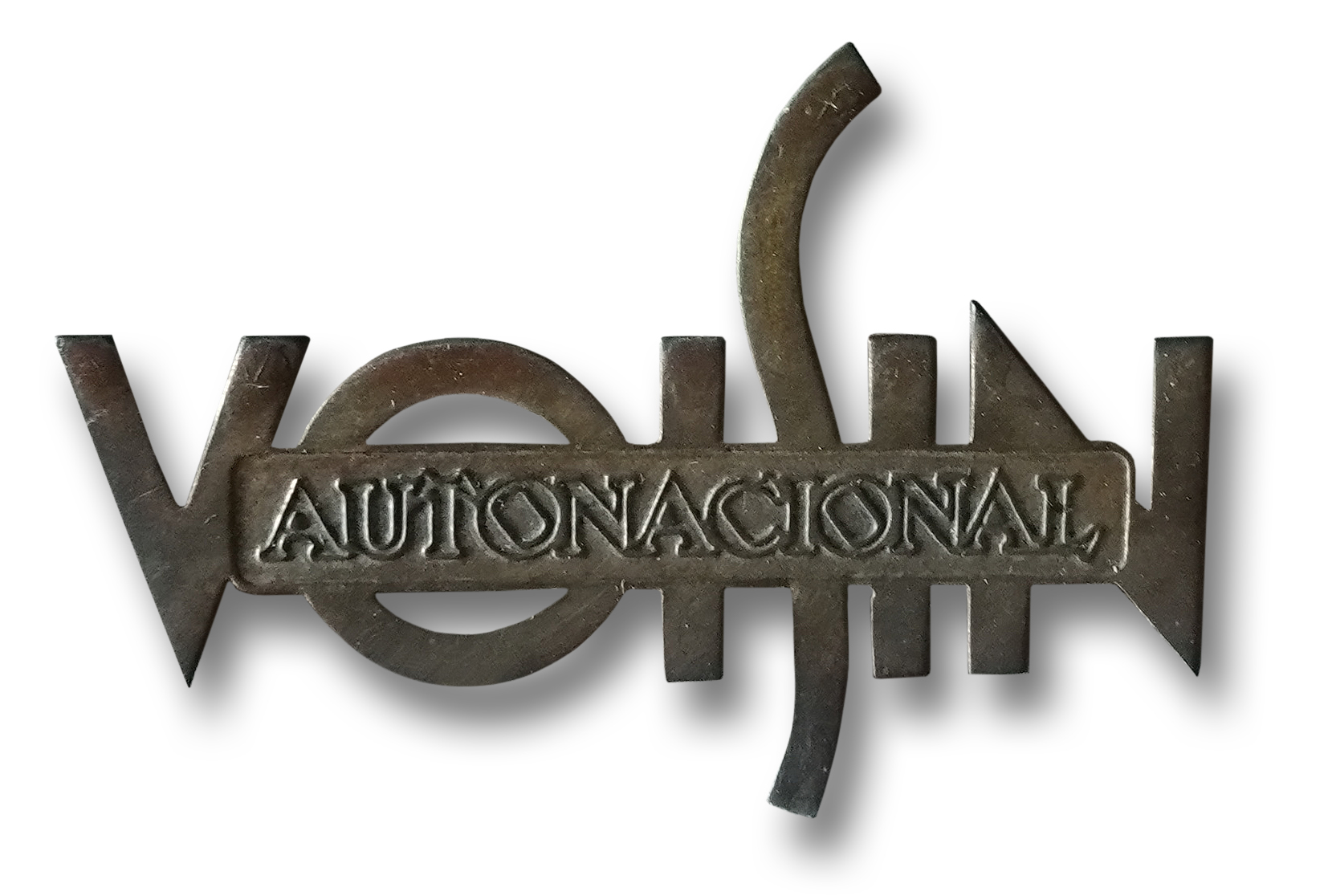
Autonacional-Voisin logo

Biscúter (Spanish spelling for the pronunciation of "BiScooter") is a microcar manufactured in Spain by Auto Nacional from 1953 until 1960. A total of around 10,000 units were produced.

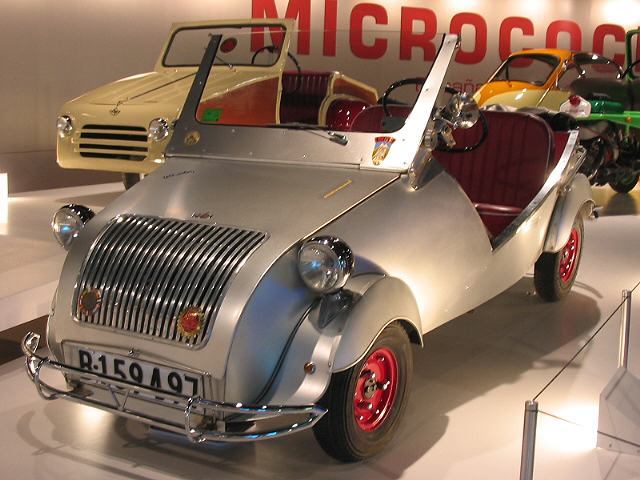
Biscúter 100

== Background ==
Raw material shortages and general economic difficulties in Europe following the Second World War made very small, economical cars popular in many countries. In Spain, following the Spanish Civil War and the embargo declared by the United Nations against General Francisco Franco's dictatorship, the situation was even worse. The combination of relative underdevelopment, war devastation and an international trade embargo meant that the country operated at a much lower economic level than the rest of Western Europe for nearly two decades and was forced to develop domestic substitutes for hard-to-get imported products and technologies. The Biscúter, tiny, simple, and cheap even by microcar standards, was a product of this economic environment and was well suited to its time and market.

== Origins ==
The car had its origins in France in the late 1940s, where aircraft and car designer and manufacturer Gabriel Voisin had designed a minimal car called the Biscooter for Avions Voisin. The playful name implied that it was about the size of two motorscooters, or a scooter with four wheels. The design drew no interest from either manufacturers or consumers there, however, and he eventually licensed it to Spanish firm Autonacional S.A. of Barcelona. By the time it was introduced in 1953, the marque had been hispanicized to Biscúter. The first car had no formal model name and was called simply the Series 100, but it soon became known as the Zapatilla, or little shoe (clog), after a low-heeled peasant slipper popular at the time.

== Technical information ==
The Zapatilla was minimal indeed, with no doors or windows or reverse gear. The 1 cylinder, 197 cc, two-stroke motor produced 9-horsepower (7 kW), had a crank starter, and drove only the right front wheel. It had a large, oil-filled cylinder head, to compensate overheating during traffic light arrests, and avoid overcooling while on road at higher speeds, producing a: 'Temperature Buffer' effect. Braking was by an unusual three-point system involving the transmission and cable ties to the two rear wheels. One genuinely advanced feature was an all-aluminum body, although steel was later used.

== History ==
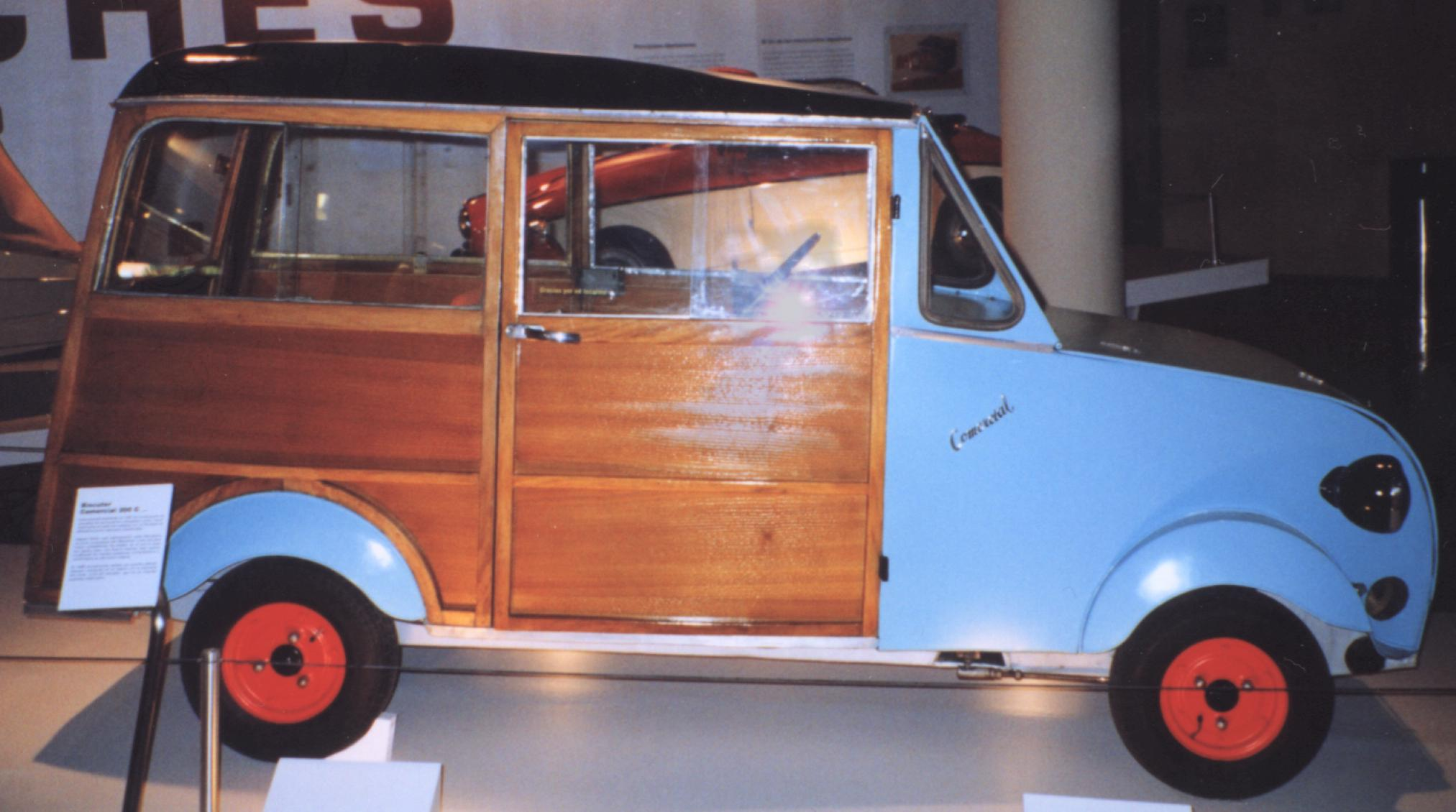
Biscuter Comercial 200 C from the right side

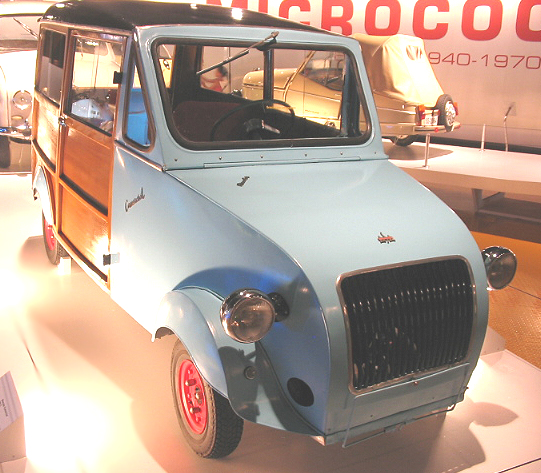
Biscúter Comercial 200 C from the right front

Biscúter flourished for about ten years and the cars became a common sight on Spanish roads, as well as a part of popular culture. ("Ugly as a Biscúter" was a common joke.) Amenities such as doors and windows did eventually appear, and several different bodystyles were produced, including trucks, an elegant woodie station wagon, and a toy-like sports car called the Pegasín (little Pegaso).

In 1950, the Spanish auto maker SEAT was set up as the country's national car manufacturer, but at first even the most inexpensive of its designs were considered luxury cars, out of reach of the average Spanish consumer. As time went on and a greater degree of prosperity developed, though, SEATs began to take more of the market and crowd out the cheaper marques. In 1957, the company attempted to produce a sports car, the Biscuter Pegasin in an attempt to attract the wealthier buyers. The styling was similar to the Pegaso Z-102, but it didn't help much. By the early 60s, Biscúter sales and production stopped, after a total production run of about 12,000. It is thought that almost all of the cars were eventually scrapped.

== Current day ==
Now Biscúters are mostly museum curiosities, although like many vanished marques they have some following among auto enthusiasts. The name is little known outside Spain, however, and most materials pertaining to it are in Spanish.
