= Automotive industry in Spain =

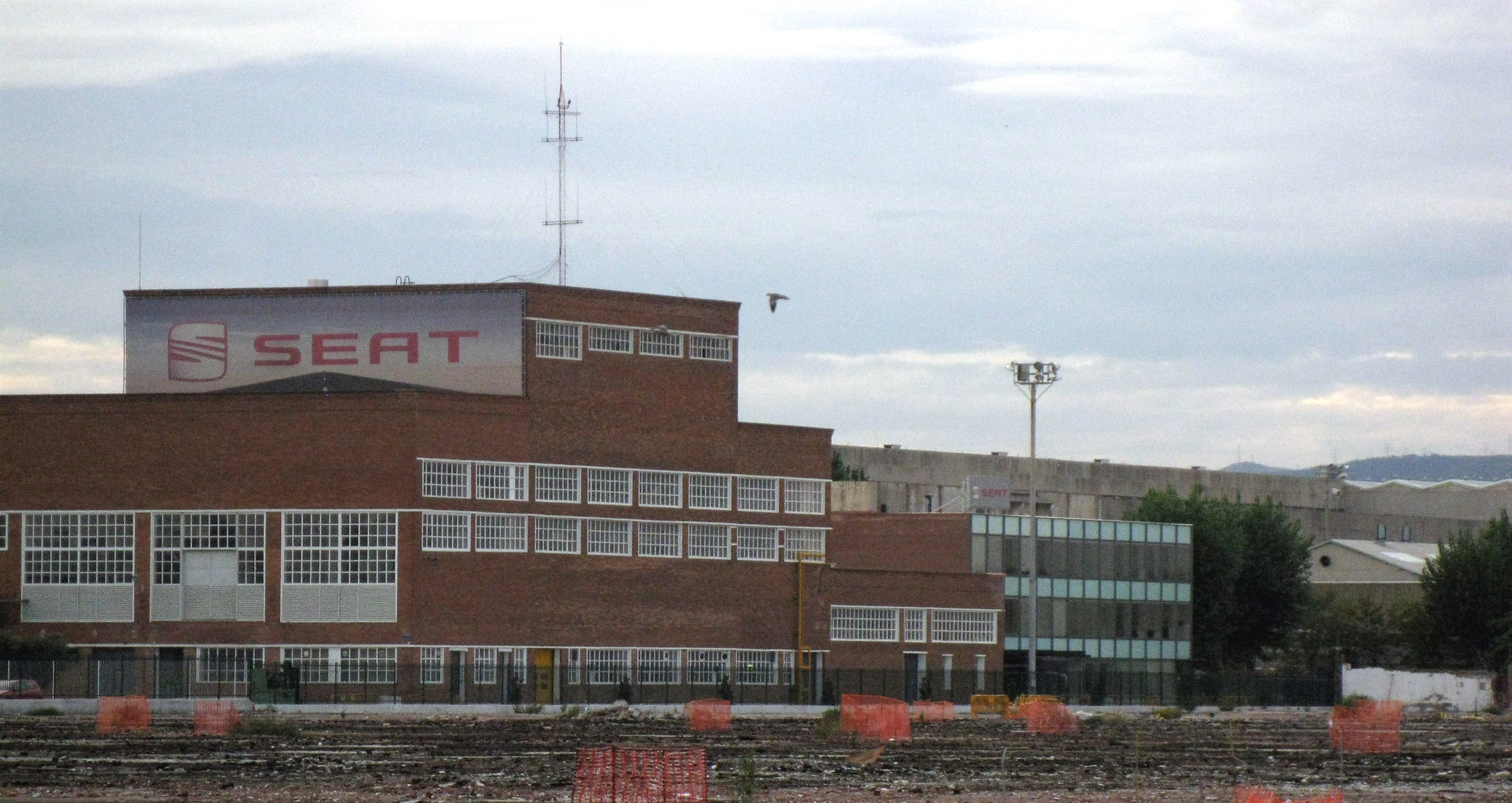
The historic premises of SEAT in Zona Franca (Barcelona) built in the 1950s

In 2024, Spain produced 2.38 million motor vehicles which made it the 9th largest motor vehicle producing country in the world and the 2nd largest motor vehicle producer in Europe after Germany.

Spain hosts 9 multinational brands. In 2023, the Spanish automotive industry generated 10% of Spain’s gross domestic product and accounted for 18% of total Spanish exports.

The main manufacturers established in the country are Mercedes-Benz Group AG (manufacturing plant in Vitoria), Ford (its plant located in Almussafes is Ford's biggest in Europe), Stellantis (at Villaverde in Madrid, Figueruelas and Vigo), Renault (with plants in Palencia and Valladolid as well as a transmission plant in Seville), SEAT (Martorell), Volkswagen (Pamplona).

== Historical development ==
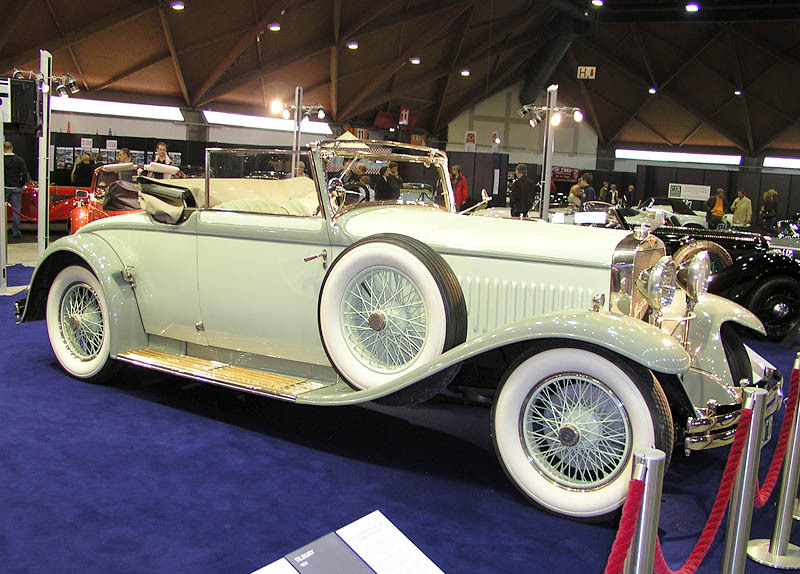
1929 Hispano-Suiza T49

Early Spanish manufacturers included the well known luxury car manufacturer Hispano-Suiza, originally founded as "La Cuadra" in 1898, and smaller companies such as Elizalde and Ricart. Foreign makers started to set up local assembly plants supplied with imported parts in the 1920s, with Ford Motor Ibérica opening its Cádiz premises in 1920 and General Motors Peninsular in Málaga in 1927. By 1936, the industry had reached a significant volume, and was in continuous growth and modernisation.

The devastation of the Spanish Civil War (1936–1939) interrupted this development, and the decade of economic isolation that followed made it very difficult for it to resume. In the mid 1940s, a number of home-grown companies started to emerge, led by Enasa, a state-owned conglomerate built around the remains of Hispano-Suiza, with brands like Pegaso or Sava. Things started to change for the Spanish car industry in the 1960s when an industrial policy was launched with measures which contributed to the Spanish miracle.

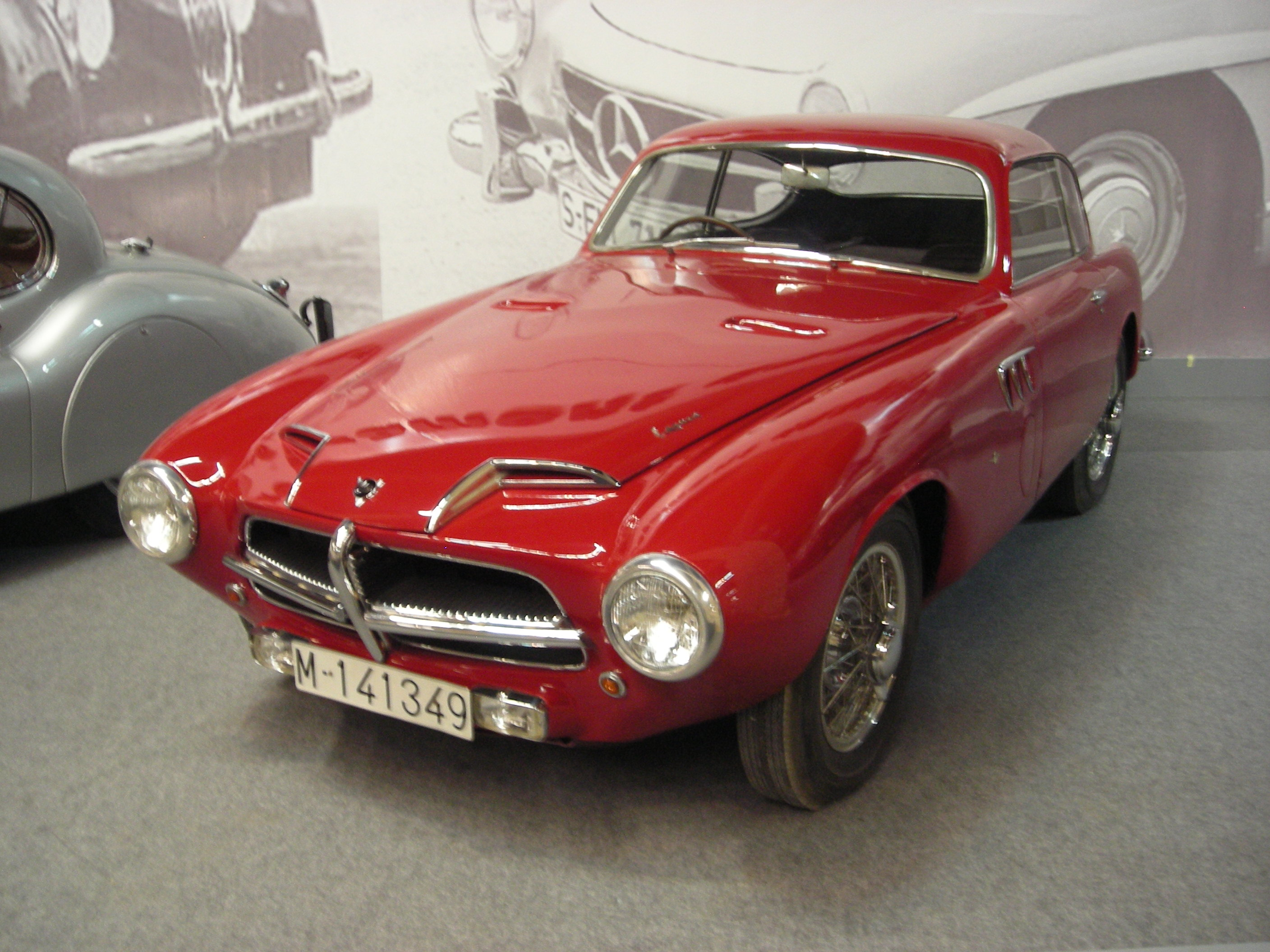
1955 Pegaso Z-102 Touring

In the years from 1958 to 1972 the sector grew at a yearly compound rate of 21.7%; in 1946 there were 72,000 private cars in Spain, in 1966 there were 1 million. This growth rate had no equal in the world. The icon of the time was the SEAT 600 car, produced by the Spanish company SEAT. More than 794,000 of them were made between 1957 and 1973, and if at the beginning of this period it was the first car for many Spanish working-class families, at its end it was the first second one for many more.

Later on, in the 1980s the Spanish automotive flagship, SEAT, was sold to the Volkswagen group, but by then the manufacturing cluster had already been consolidated and other international manufacturers were already producing in Spain.

== Spanish brands ==
=== Present Spanish brands ===
==== SEAT ====
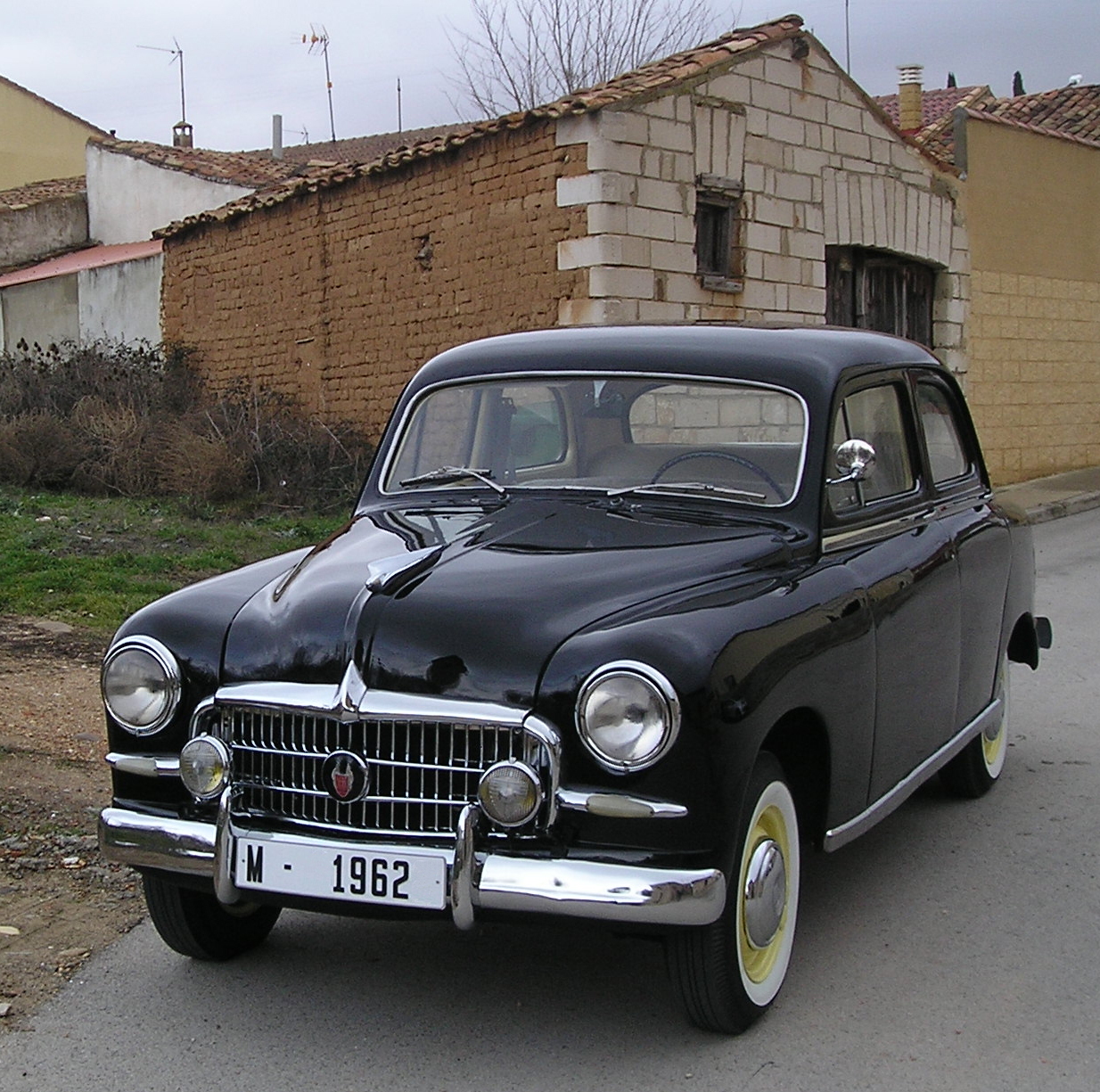
A SEAT 1400, the first model produced by the Spanish company

SEAT is the sole active Spanish mass production car company (today operating as a subsidiary of Volkswagen) that develops its own models in-house. It was founded in 1950 by the state owned Instituto Nacional de Industria (INI) and six Spanish banks with FIAT assistance, under the name Sociedad Española de Automóviles de Turismo (Spanish Saloon/Sedan Car Company). In 1953 the company produced their first model, the SEAT 1400. This 44 hp (33 kW) four-door saloon car had a top speed of 75 mph (120 km/h). When production ceased in 1964 over 98,000 had been made. Models produced licensed by FIAT in the 1960s include the 600, 850, 1500 and 124. 815,319 of the 800 models were made between 1964 and 1967. SEAT produced its one millionth car in 1968. By 2003 this figure had risen to more than 14 million.

During the 1970s SEAT produced the 67 hp (50 kW) 1200 model (1975 to 1980) and over 1.5 million 131 models (1974 to 1984).

The SEAT 1200 Sport was a 2-door coupé produced by SEAT from 1975 to 1979. The car was known as the "Bocanegra" because of the shape of its always black plastic nose panel, which embraced the front grille and the headlights and incorporated, by 1970s standards, a prominent front bumper. "Boca negra" means "black mouth" in Spanish.

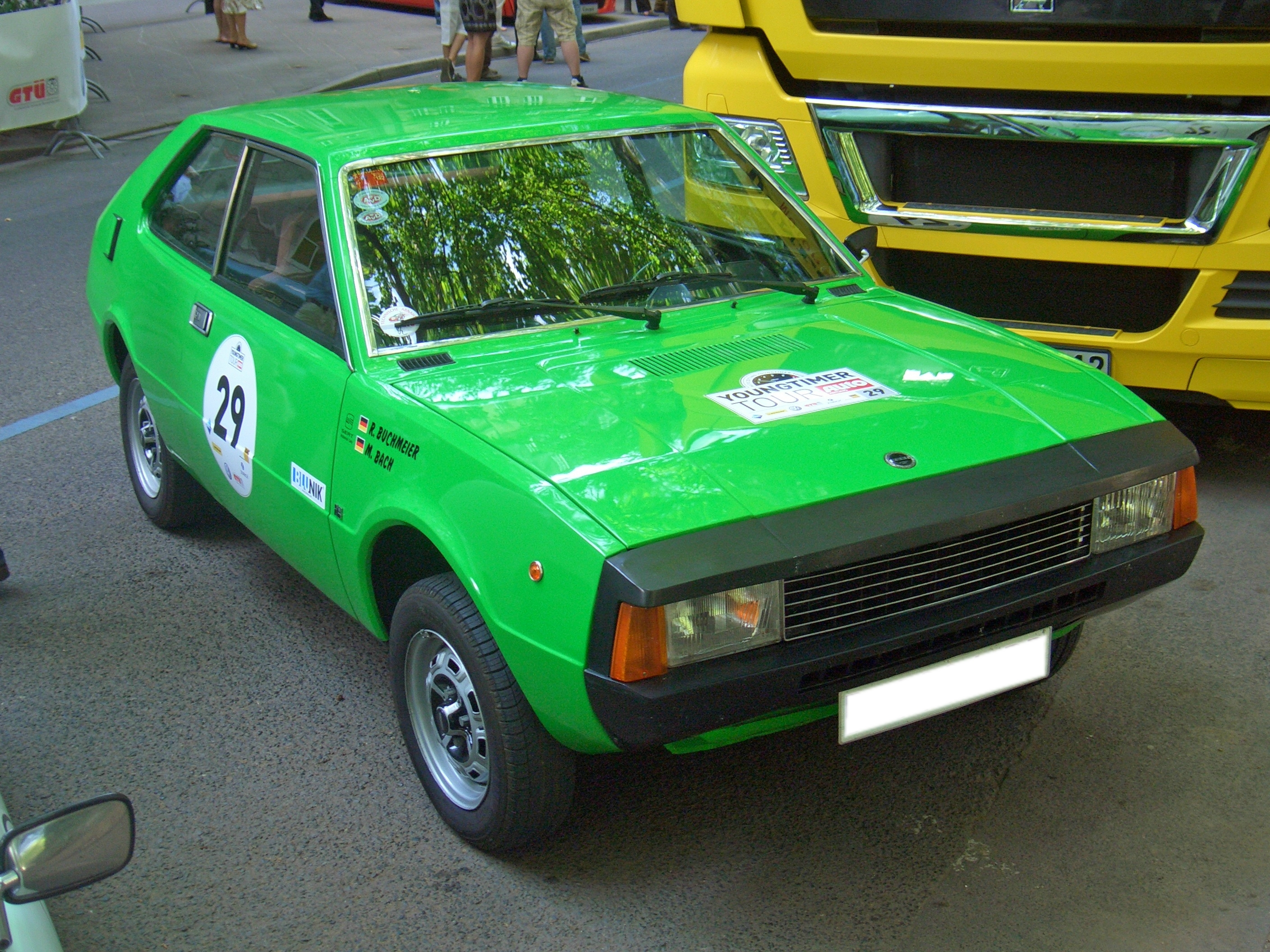
A SEAT 1200 Sport Coupé

Other models produced at this time include the 127, 128, 132, 133 and the Ritmo. FIAT’s assistance ended in 1981 and was replaced by a cooperation agreement with the Volkswagen Group in 1982.

Up to 1981 most SEAT cars resembled FIAT models. The 1982 Ronda model was the first car produced by SEAT without assistance from FIAT. SEAT became a subsidiary of the Volkswagen Group in 1986.

Other cars produced during the 1980s include the Fura (1981–86), Marbella (1986–98), Málaga (1985–92) and Ibiza. The Marbella was a re-badged Fiat Panda, while the Giugiaro styled Ibiza (launched in 1984) was the company's first new product after the split from FIAT. The Malaga was the saloon version of the Ibiza, but the Ibiza was far more popular.

Models produced between 1990 and 2007 include the Arosa, León, Córdoba, Toledo, Alhambra and the Altea. In 2008 the company introduced the 1.4-litre, 170 hp (127 kW) Bocanegra (4th generation Ibiza) concept car. The Ibiza was in its fourth generation by 2008. The Toledo, launched in 1991, was SEAT's first large family car since its split from FIAT. The Cordoba, which ran between 1993 and 2008, was the saloon version of the second and third generation Ibiza hatchbacks, and was slightly more popular than the earlier Malaga. The Alhambra was SEAT's first MPV, launched in 1996 and based on the Volkswagen Sharan and Ford Galaxy. The Leon, launched in 1999, was a small family hatchback aimed at the likes of the Ford Focus and Opel Astra. SEAT's replacement for the long-running Marbella was the SEAT Arosa, launched in 1997; it formed the basis of the Volkswagen Lupo which was launched over a year later.

2009 models include the León Mk2, Córdoba Mk2, Toledo Mk3, Alhambra Mk1, Ibiza Mk4 and Altea and the new flagship sedan model Exeo. The Exeo being derived from the Audi A4, shares the same fundamental powertrain layout and platform.

Until the mid 1980s, SEAT cars were rarely seen outside Spain, but have since become popular in many export markets, including Britain, where sales began in the autumn of 1985. Just under 6,000 SEATs were sold in Britain in 1986, the company's first full year of trading there, exceeding 10,000 sales in 1988 and exceeding 20,000 a year by 2000, peaking at more than 45,000 in 2013.

=== Historic Spanish brands ===
==== Abadal ====
Francisco Abadal, who used to work for Hispano-Suiza, produced two luxury models between 1912 and 1923. They were fitted with either a 3,104cc four-cylinder engine or a 4,521 cc six-cylinder engine. From about 1917 Buick engines were fitted and these cars were called Abadal- Buicks. Approximately 170 Imperia-Abadals were built in Belgium, including a 2,992 cc sports model.

==== Authi ====
The Authi Car Company, which was formed in 1965, was the result of a collaboration agreement between Nueva Montana Quijano and the British Motor Corporation. The company produced the following models: Authi Mini (1968–1975), Authi Mini Cooper (1973–1975), Morris 1100/1300 (1966–1972), Austin Victoria (1972–1975) and the Austin de Luxe (1974–1975). In 1976 the company was purchased by the SEAT Car Company.

==== Barreiros ====
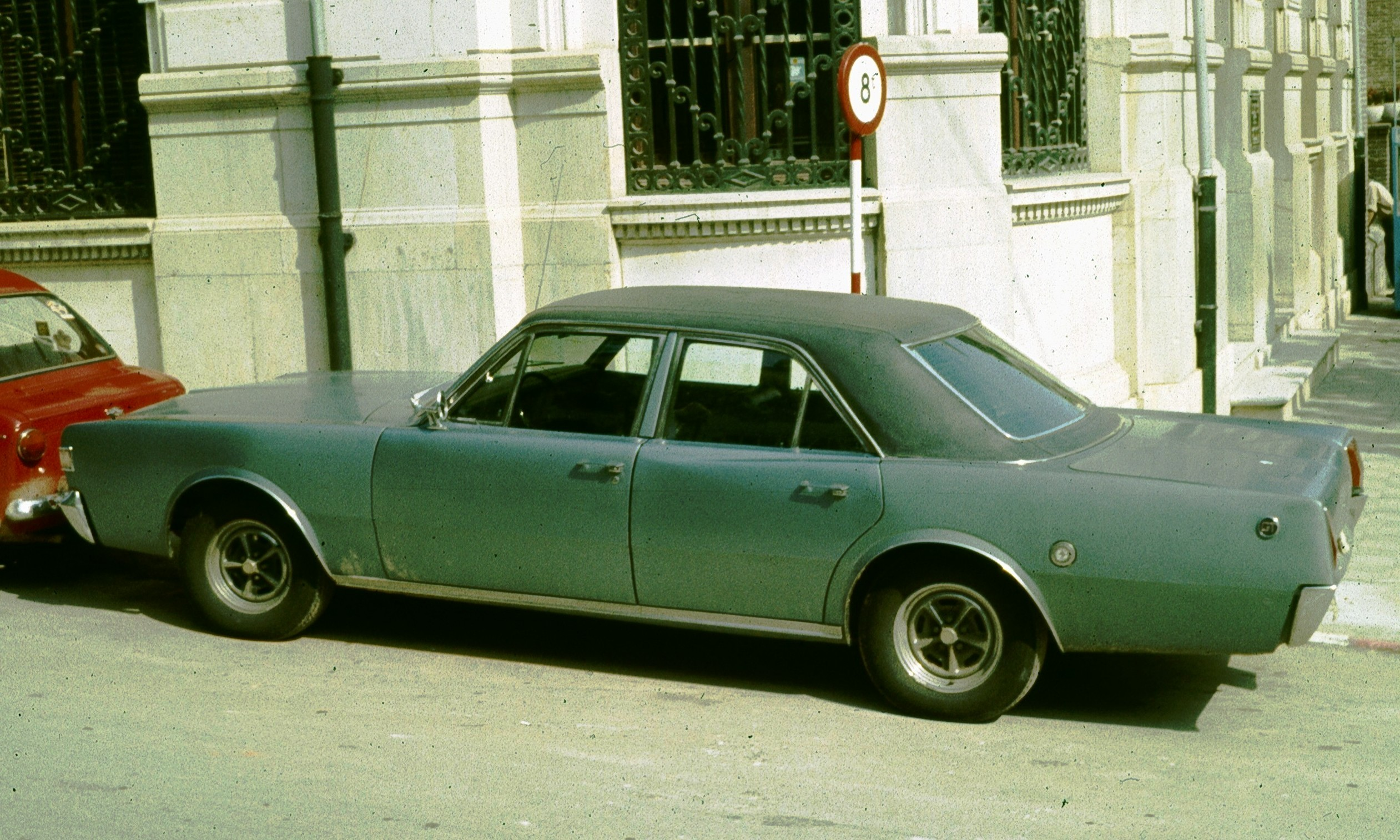
Barreiros-Dodge 3700 made in Spain.

The company was founded in 1954 as Barreiros Diesel S.A and initially it produced diesel engines. In 1963 a licensing agreement was reached with Chrysler to build the Dodge Dart in Spain. Between 1965 and 1977 a total of 17,589 Barreiros Darts were produced. These were based on the Dodge Dart GL, the Dodge Dart GT ("sporty" version) and the Dodge 3700GT (using the body of the Argentinian Dodge Polara/Coronado). A diesel version called the "Barreiros Diesel" was also produced. In 1969 Chrysler Europe took over the company. From the mid-1970s Barreiros started manufacturing the Chrysler 180 and later the Simca 1307 (called the Chrysler 150 in Spain) and the Simca Horizon. In 1978, PSA Peugeot Citroën purchased Chrysler Europe and former models were renamed; the Chrysler 150 becoming the Talbot 150. Barreiros later produced the Talbot Solara and Talbot Samba.

==== Biscuter ====
In the late 1940s Gabriel Voisin (French) designed a small car called the Biscooter. The license to build the vehicle was obtained by Autonacional S.A. The first Biscuter car was launched in Spain in 1953 and was called the Series 100 or the Zapatilla (little shoe). The original models did not have doors, windows or a reverse gear. It was powered by a one-cylinder, 197 cc, two-stroke 9 hp (7 kW) engine which supplied power only to the right front wheel. The Biscúter car was produced for about ten years.

==== Elizalde ====
In 1909 Arturo Elizalde Rouvier started a company was called "Sociedad Mercantil J. M. Vallet y Cia" to manufacturer car parts. A prototype called the Tipo 11 was launched in mid-1914. In 1915, King Alfonso XIII owned a 20cv Biada-Elizalde cabriolet Tipo 20. A 25cv sports version of the Tipo 20 was produced in 1919 as the Reine Victoria (name of the Queen consorts). It is believed to be the first Spanish car to feature four-wheel brakes. In 1920 the company started production of the four-cylinder, 3,817 cc, Model 29. Variants of this model were built until 1927. Production of the 8,143 cc straight-eight model, known as the Tipo 48, also began in 1920. The car had a built in tire pump which could also be used as a vacuum cleaner. A 5,181 cc straight-eight Gran Sport version of the Tipo 48 model, capable of 100 mph (160 km/h), was also produced. Production of Elizalde cars ceased in 1928.

==== ENASA ====
ENASA sort of (Empresa Nacional de Autocamiones S.A.) was a Spanish truck manufacturing company, incorporated in 1946 having bought the automotive assets of the Spanish arm of Hispano-Suiza. It produced trucks, buses sport-cars and military armored vehicles under the Pegaso brand and, for a short while, Sava brands. Pegaso built about a hundred high-end Z-102 sports cars in the 1950s. The cars were in many ways advanced for the time, as they had all-wheel independent suspension, a five-speed gearbox, very powerful supercharged engines, and were offered with the choice of Touring, Saoutchik, Serra or Enasa's own luxury bodies. Enasa belonged to the state-owned INI industrial holding. In 1990 Enasa was sold to Fiat S.p.A. - Iveco.

==== Eucort ====
The Eugenio Cortes SA (company) manufactured cars from 1945 to 1953. The first Eucort model, which was based on a pre World War II Germany Dampf Kraft Wagen (DKW) design, was fitted with 764 cc twin-cylinder two-stroke engine. Four-door sedan and a three-door estate versions were available. In 1950 the company started production of its final model, the two-stroke 1,034 cc Victoria. By the time the company ceased car production in 1953 about 1,500 Eucort cars (including taxis) had been built.

==== Hispano-Suiza ====
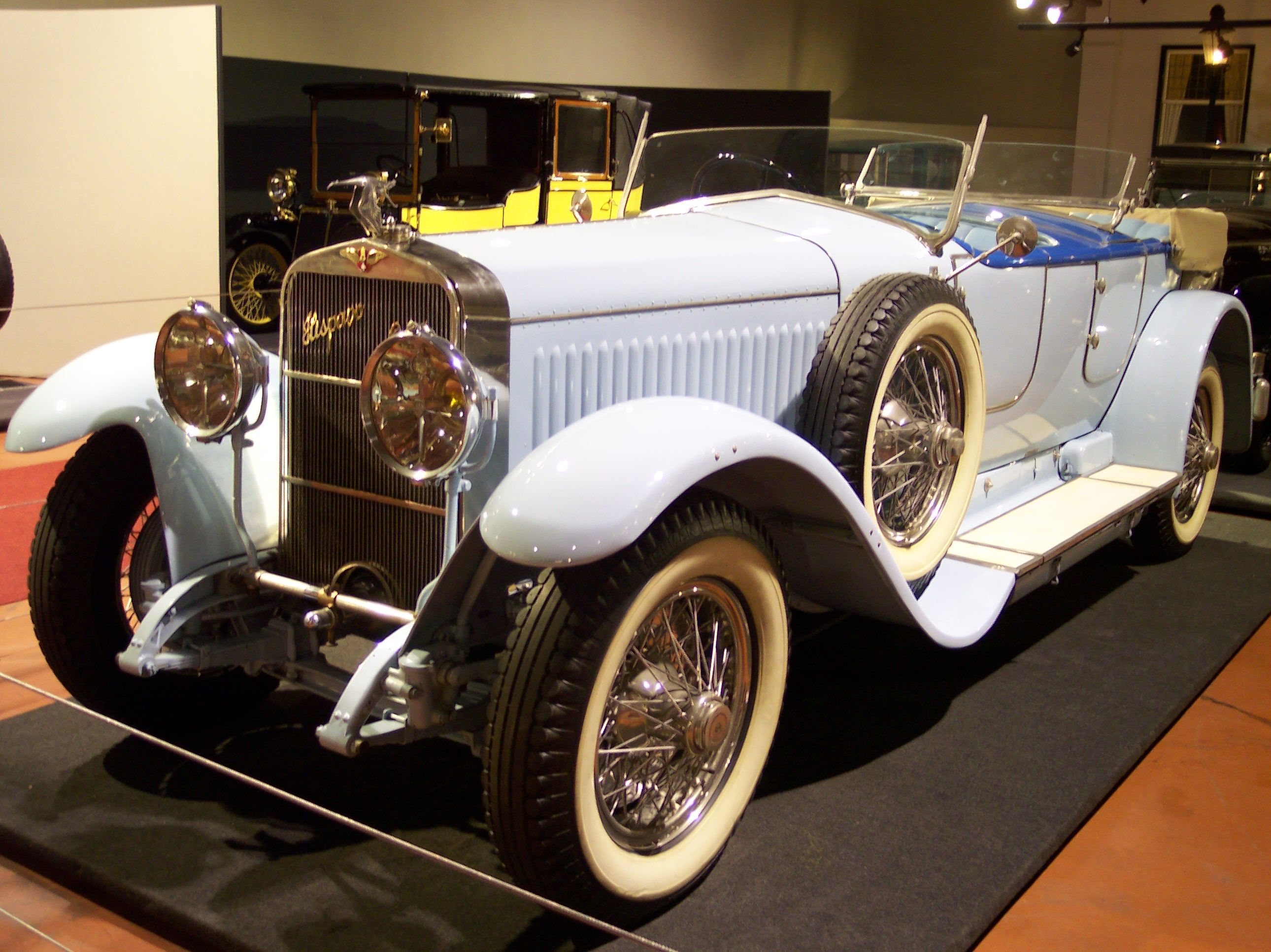
Hispano-Suiza 1924 H6B ultra-luxurious automobile.

In 1898 Emilio de la Cuadra started a company in Barcelona called "La Cuadra" to produce electric cars. Four years later it was acquired by J. Castro. He changed the name to "Fábrica Hispano-Suiza de Automóviles" (Spanish-Swiss Car Factory). By the end of 1903 this company went bankrupt, re-emerging in 1904 as "La Hispano-Suiza Fábrica de Automóviles". In 1906 Hispano-Suiza produced two models of 3.8 and 7.4 litres. Between 1907 and 1914 the company mass-produced a range of cars, plus a number of hand-built racing models, including the Type A (1907), Type 15 (1910) and the four-cylinder 3,620 cc 65 hp (48 kW) Alphonse XIII (1911–14). In 1911 a factory called "Hispano France" was established just outside Paris, moving to another location in 1914, when they took the name "Hispano-Suiza". The Stork statuette fitted on top of each car's radiator was based on the squadron emblem painted on the side of the aircraft used by a World War I French ace, who owned a Hispano-Suiza car.

The Hispano-Suiza H6 range was introduced in 1919. It was mainly built at the Paris factory. A few model built in Spain were called the T41. About 2,350 of these ultra-luxury models were made up to 1933; the 6,597 cc H6B (1919–32), and H6C (1926–33). Between 1924 and 1927 about 50 H6Bs were built under license by Skoda of Czechoslovakia. The H6 was one of the first cars to be fitted with power-assisted brakes and originally came with a 6.5-litre engine. An 8-litre engine was fitted to the H6C model.

In 1923 the French part of Hispano-Suiza became known as the Societé Française Hispano-Suiza . The 8-litre T56 model was produced from 1928, plus a 3,750 cc T49 model. Other models produced in Spain the 1920s include the 4.7-litre T30 4.7 (1914–24) and the 3,089 cc T16 (1921–24). In 1930 Hispano-Suiza took over Ballot, the French car manufacturer. The six-cylinder 4,580cc Junior model was produced from about 1930 to 1934. It was replaced by the 5.1-litre 120 hp (89 kW) K6 (1934–37). The 9,425 cc Type 68, which was produced in 1931, later evolved into an 11,310 cc version. A six-cylinder version, the K6, succeeded the Junior in 1934. During the 1930s the company produced a range of luxury cars, including the 4.5-litre 95 hp (71 kW) HS26 (1932), the 9.4-litre 210 hp (160 kW) and 11.3-litre 260 hp (190 kW) J12 model (1932–38) The last model produced by the company in Spain was the T6ORL. The car was produced from 1934 to about 1943. After the Second World War, Hispano-Suiza France was primarily an aerospace firm. from 1955 Their attention turned increasingly to jet engine manufacturing and, in 1968, they became a division of SNECMA. In 1999, they moved their turbine engines operations to a new factory in Bezons, outside of Paris, using the original factories for power transmissions and accessory systems for jet engines. In 2005, SNECMA merged with SAGEM to form SAFRAN.

In Spain the Hispano-Suiza company sold in 1946 their automotive assets to "Empresa Nacional de Autocamiones S.A" (Enasa), a Spanish vehicle manufacturing company. It has become Pegaso brand.

==== Kapi ====
Automóviles y Autoscooter Kapi produced cars from 1950 to 1955.

The first model was a three-wheeled two-door car that was powered by a 125 cc single-cylinder two-stroke engine.

Other models include the Chiqui, a three-wheeler with single wheel at the rear, the Platillo Volante, a four-wheel coupé and the M190 with miniature Mercedes 190 body.

== Bus manufacturing ==
Spain has the largest number of independent coachbuilders in Europe, producing bespoke models for the international market. Contrary to the large European bus manufacturers, who build their buses as standard models on an integral chassis, most Spanish manufacturers build a bodywork on a chassis supplied by a third party, allowing for a large variety of designs. As of December 2017, active coachbuilders include:

- Ayats
- Beulas
- Burilla
- Car-bus.net
- Castrosua
- Ferqui
- Indcar
- Integralia
- Irizar
- Nogebus
- Obradors
- Sunsundegui
- Unvi
- Vectia

== Multinational subsidiaries ==
Many foreign car and truck makers - like Volkswagen, Nissan, Daimler AG, Ford, Renault, Stellantis, Iveco etc. - as well as suppliers have facilities and plants in Spain today developing and producing vehicles and components, not only for the needs of the internal market but also for exportation purposes, with the contribution of the automobile industry in 2008 rising up to the second place with 17,6% out of the country's total exports.

Ford opened a factory at Valencia in 1976 to build its new European supermini, the Fiesta, which is still being built there 40 years and several incarnations later, although it has also been built in Britain and Germany. The Escort and Orion were also built there in the 1980s and 1990s, as was the Ka from 1996 until 2008, when production of its successor was switched to the Fiat factory in Poland. The Escort's successor, the Focus was produced at the Valencia plant from 1998 until 2011, since when all European production of the third generation Focus has been concentrated in Germany. The C-Max version of the third generation Focus, however, was built there from 2010 until 2014. The factory also hosted production of a Mazda model, the Mazda 2, from 2002 to 2007, as part of Ford's venture with the Japanese carmaker.

Renault set up a production facility at Valladolid in 1951, producing some of its French made products for the Spanish market. The Spanish production of some Renault models originally took place under the FASA-Renault banner, and from 1974 to 1984 the company actually built its own saloon version of the hugely successful Renault 5 hatchback, which was known as the Renault 7, and was only built at the Valladolid plant. Nearly 160,000 R7's were sold, most of them on the Spanish market. The Spanish operations were rebranded Renault Espana from 2000.

General Motors Europe opened a new factory at Zaragoza in 1982, for production of its new Corsa supermini - which was imported to the United Kingdom as the Vauxhall Nova. Production of the Opel Kadett/Vauxhall Astra also commenced at Zaragoza in 1986. The Meriva was built there between its launch in 2003–2017. GM sold Opel/Vauxhall to PSA Peugeot Citroën in 2017. PSA Peugeot Citroën then merged with Fiat Chrysler Automobiles to form Stellantis in 2021.

Volkswagen has concentrated production of its Polo supermini at SEAT's Pamplona plant since it bought the company in 1986. All versions of the SEAT Ibiza produced since 1993 have featured the same floorpan and engines as the Volkswagen Polo of that generation.

Nissan built cars in Spain at its Barcelona factory from 1983 until 2021. The first model to be produced there was the Patrol four-wheel drive. It built several model ranges for the passenger car and commercial vehicle markets, the most recent addition being the Pulsar family hatchback in 2014. Nissan also built rebadged vans for LDV and rebadged SUV's for Ford of Europe in Barcelona. Nissan also built pickup trucks there for itself as well as partners Renault and Mercedes-Benz. Nissan closed the Barcelona plant at the end of 2021.

== See also ==
- Economy of Spain
- AFA (automobile) a 1943 car
