= Arbúcies =

- Municipality
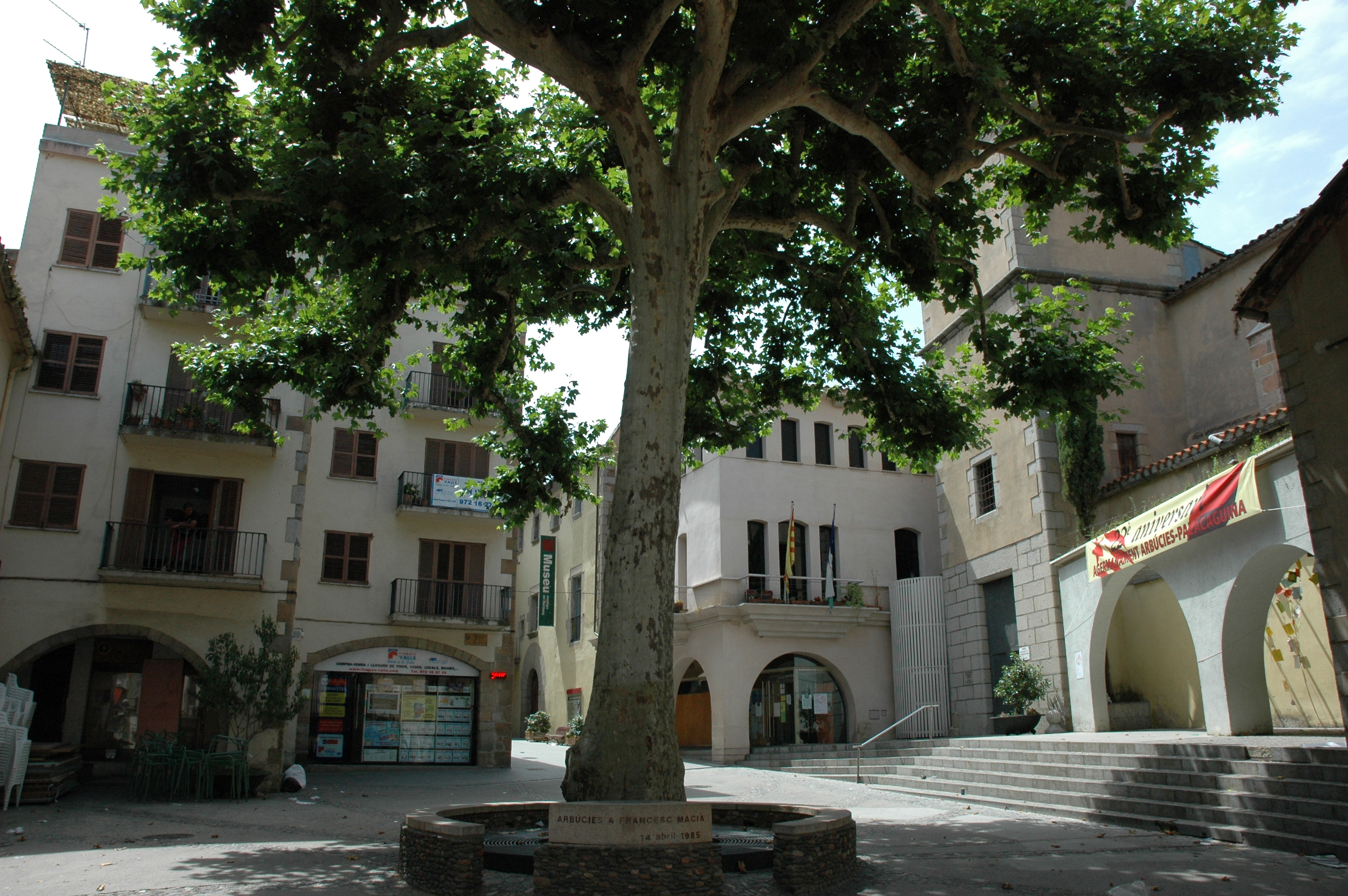
- Main square in Arbúcies

- Flag Coat of arms

- Location in Catalonia Arbúcies (Spain)
- Coordinates: 41°49′4″N 2°31′1″E
- Country: Spain
- Community: Catalonia
- Province: Girona
- Comarca: Selva

Government
  - Mayor: Pere Garriga Solà (2015)

Area
  - Total: 86.2 km^{2} (33.3 sq mi)

Population (2025-01-01)
  - Total: 6,665
  - Density: 77.3/km^{2} (200/sq mi)
- Website: arbucies.cat

Arbúcies (Catalan pronunciation: [əɾˈβusiəs]) is a village in the province of Girona, in the autonomous community of Catalonia, Spain. The municipality covers an area of 86.24 square kilometres (33.30 sq mi) with a population of 6481 in 2014.

== History ==
Arbúcies was populated by the Iberians and later by the Romans. In the Middle Ages, when feudalism was established, Montsoriu Castle and viscounts of Cabrera were very important.

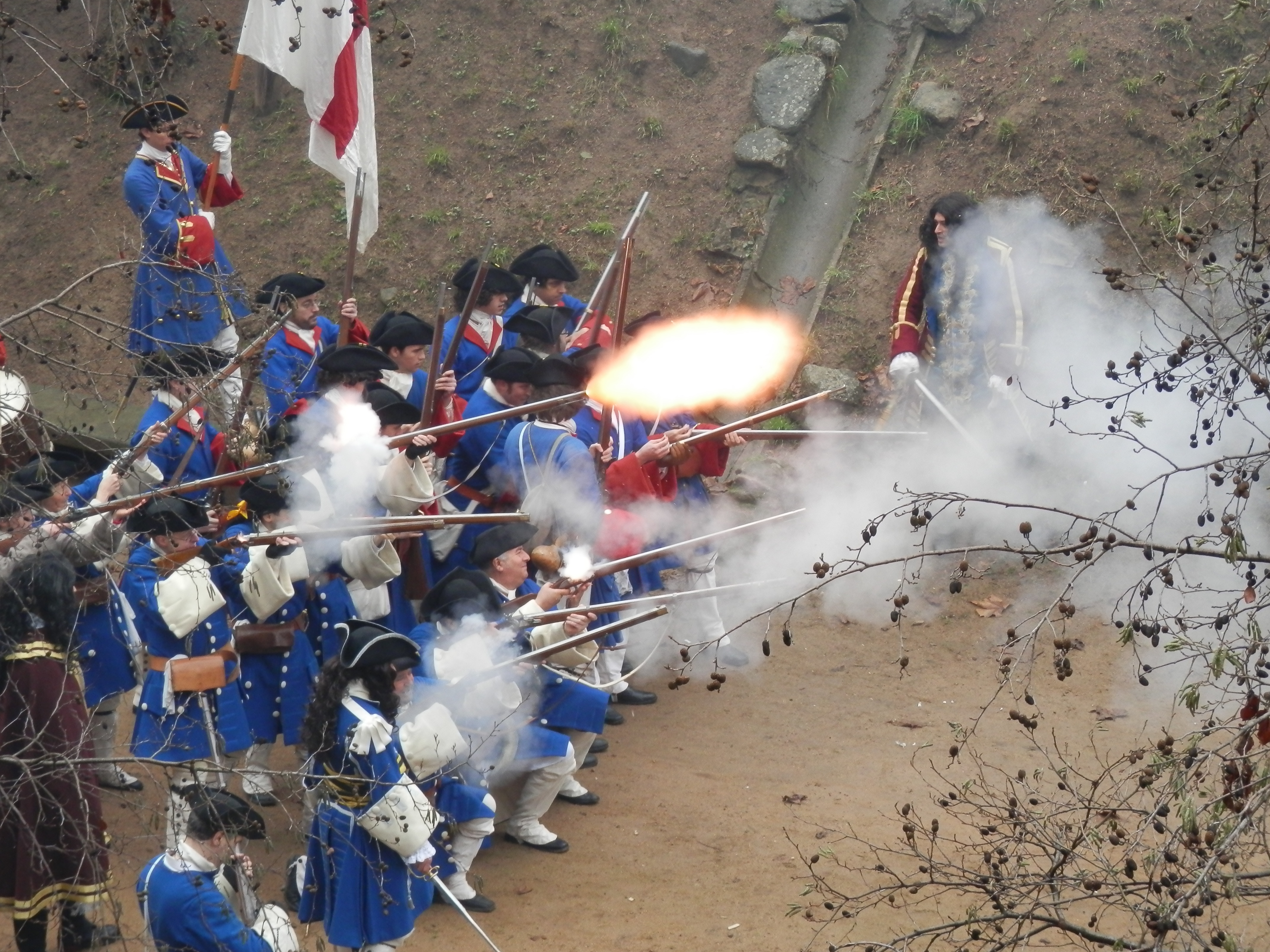
Reenactment of the battle of Arbúcies, portrayed by the reenactment groups Miquelets de Catalunya and Miquelets de Girona.

The Battle of Arbúcies took place on 14 January 1714 during the War of the Spanish Succession between the militia of the surrounding area, supporters of Archduke Charles of Austria, and the Walloon forces of the Duke of Anjou. The clash took place near the Arbúcies stream, against a 15th-century mill. Bourbon troops, en route from Hostalric to Vic, were totally defeated and lost six flags. The town of Arbúcies was completely burnt in the wave of repression unleashed by the Duke of Pópoli.

== Economy ==
Arbúcies' main industry is the manufacturing of bus chassis. The principal manufacturing companies of Spain are located in Arbúcies: Beulas, Ayats, Indcar, and Noge.

The other important industry in the village is Jocavi, a textile company that manufactures clothes for women and exports to all Europe.

== Notable people ==
- Keita Baldé, footballer
- Antonio Durán, former football player and coach
