= Julià =

Spanish coach transport company

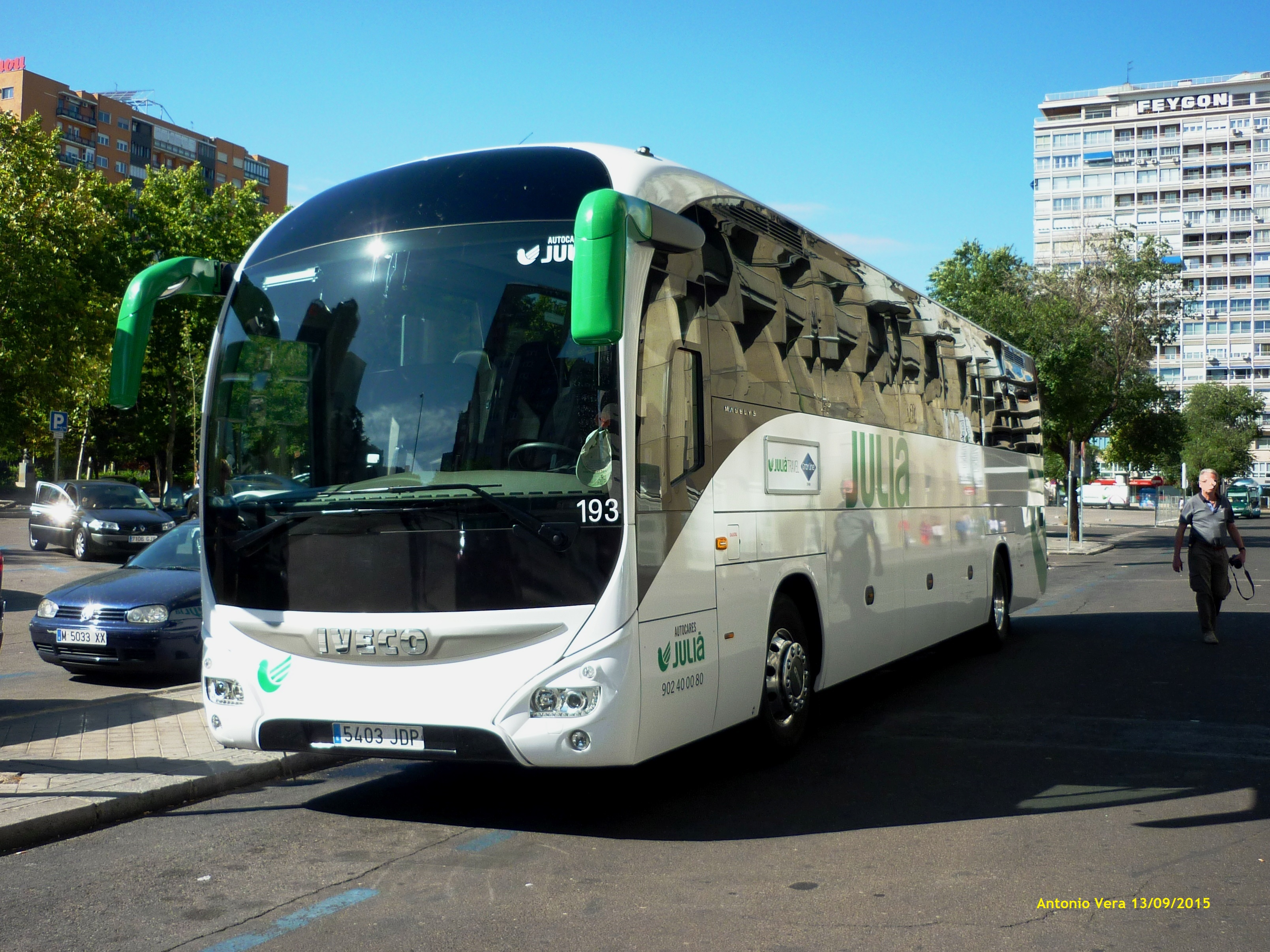
Julià bus in Madrid

Julià is a Spanish business group providing passenger bus transport and tourism services. Founded in Barcelona in 1933, the company operates coach transport, inbound tourism activities, and sightseeing bus services in several cities across Europe, the Americas, and North Africa.

The company has grown from its family-owned origins in Spain into an international corporation with operations in Andorra, the United Kingdom, Italy, Mexico, Argentina, Morocco, and the United States. As of November 2024, the bus company reportedly had a fleet of approximately 450 vehicles.

== History ==
Grupo Julià was founded in Barcelona in 1933 as Autocares Julià, initially providing coach transport services for schools, cultural associations, and football teams.

Operations were suspended during the Spanish Civil War but resumed in the late 1930s. Later, by the 1940s and 1950s the company consolidated as a provider of coach services in Catalonia, operating their first excursions in Barcelona and surroundings, and then spread to other regions in Spain.

In 1968, Julià Tours was created, specializing in long-distance holiday travel. In 1978, Julià Travel was launched to handle inbound tourism in Spain, while operations simultaneously began in Argentina and Mexico.

In 2000, the company introduced the City Tour brand for hop-on hop-off sightseeing buses in Barcelona and Madrid. Around the same time, it launched Turibus in Mexico City, one of Latin America's first hop-on hop-off services—and established a joint venture with Alsa to support the development and expansion of its sightseeing activities.

In 2014, Grupo Julià expanded to the United States with Gray Line sightseeing services in San Francisco and extended City Tour operations to London (2015), Rome (2016), and Tanger (2018).

In 2024, a joint venture between Grupo Julià and Moventis was awarded a 12-year concession to continue operating Barcelona's official tourist bus service, Barcelona City Tour, with plans to transition to a fully electric fleet by 2029.

== Structure ==
Grupo Julià is organized into three business divisions: tourism, sightseeing buses and trains and passenger transport.

The tourism division provides travel and excursion services primarily for visitors to Spain as well as outbound travel products. These activities are conducted through brands including Julià Travel and Julià Tours.

Through its City Tour operations, the company manages hop-on hop-off sightseeing bus and tourist train services in several cities. These services operate in cooperation with local partners and transport operators depending on the destination.

- Barcelona City Tour is a joint venture with Moventis.
- Madrid City Tour jointly operated by Grupo Julià and Alsa.
- Granada City Tour in partnership with Alsa.
- San Sebastián City Tour in association with Alsa.
- London City Tour in collaboration with City Sightseeing and Stagecoach Group.
- Roma City Tour in collaboration with Carrani.
- Tánger City Tour with a branding and distribution agreement with Alsa.

== Environmental initiatives ==
In November 2024, Grupo Julià partnered with UK-based Zenobē to finance the electrification of its Barcelona fleet. The agreement encompasses the purchase of electric buses, battery leasing, and the installation and operation of charging infrastructure.

The group has also developed maritime excursions using low-emission vessels along the Barcelona coastline.
