= Alsa (company) =

Spanish transport company

ALSA
- Type: Private limited company
- Industry: Public transport
- Founded: 1923
- Headquarters: Madrid, Spain
- Owner: Mobico Group
- Number of employees: 8,914 (2017)
- Website: alsa.com

ALSA (Automóviles Luarca, S.A.) is a Spanish subsidiary of the UK company Mobico Group, which operates bus and coach services in Spain and other countries across Europe, including Andorra, Austria, Belgium, the Czech Republic, France, Germany, Hungary, Italy, Malta, Cyprus, the Netherlands, Poland, Portugal, Romania, Slovakia, Switzerland and Ukraine. It also has operations in Morocco.

ALSA also had operations in China and Chile, but these were retained by the previous owners of the company and are not owned by National Express.

== History ==
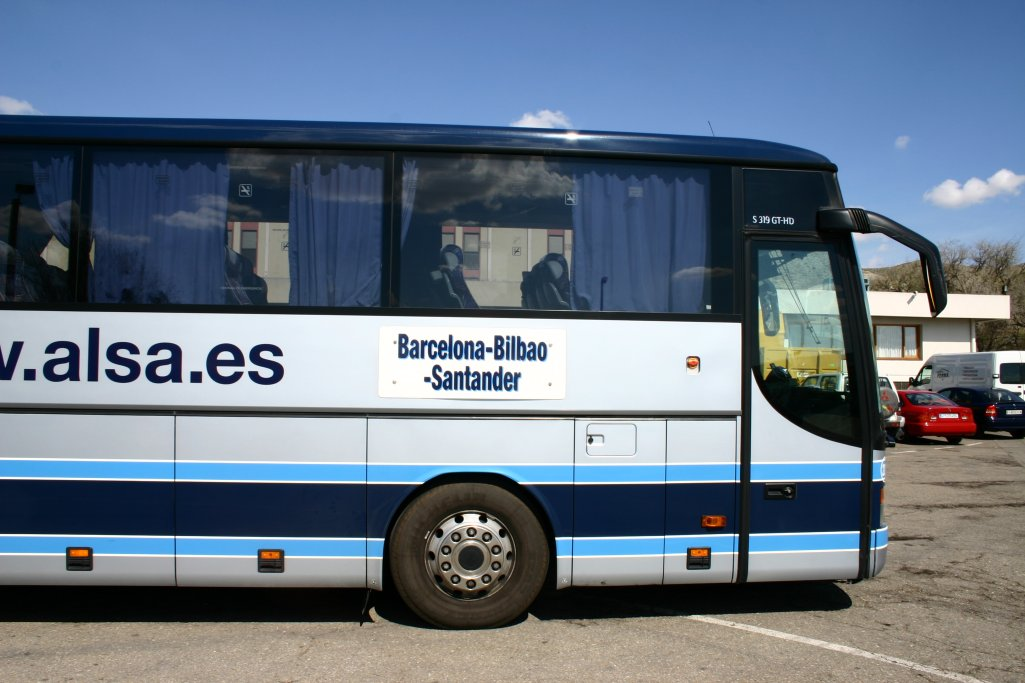
ALSA Setra S319GT-HD bus in 2005

When ALSA was incorporated in 1923, it was merely a regional operator based in Luarca and Oviedo, in the Spanish northern region of Asturias.

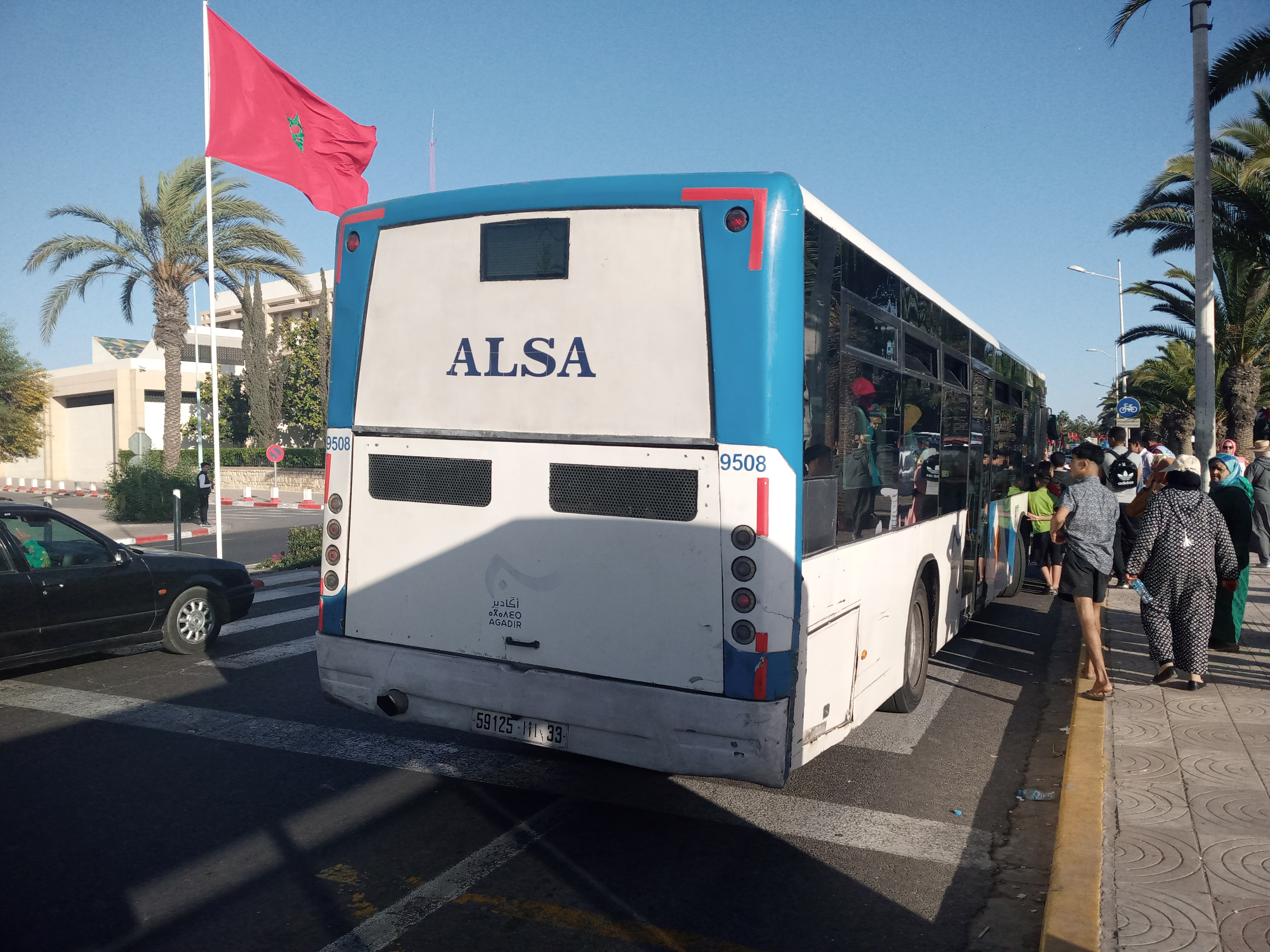
ALSA bus in Morocco (2020)

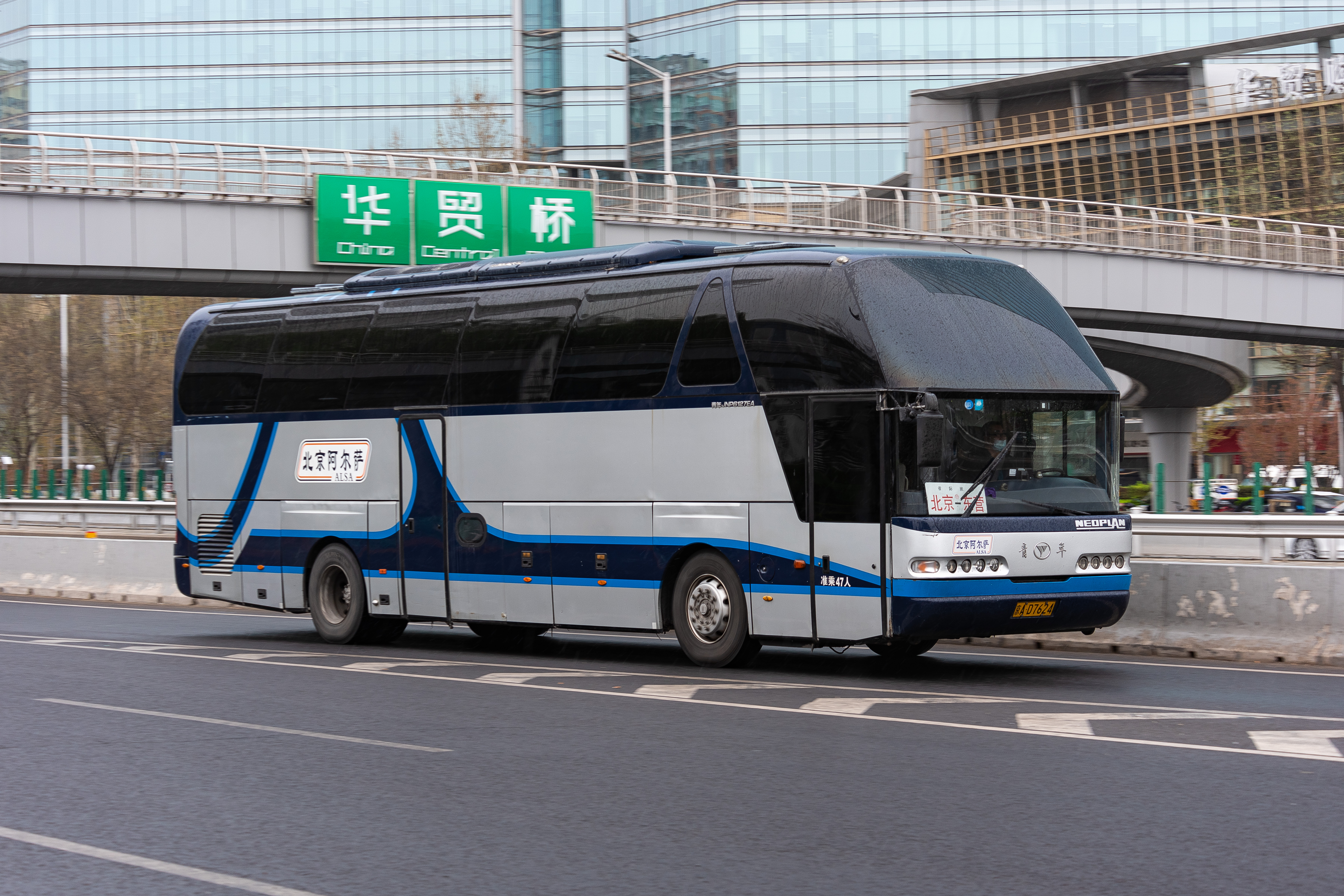
Beijing ALSA's Youngman JNP6127EA in 2021

In the 1920s and 1930s the Alsa flagship service was the 170 km Oviedo-Luarca-Ribadeo route, northwest from Oviedo, with thirteen fixed and thirty occasional stops, a 10-hour journey. This was later extended to A Coruña.

In the 1940s and 1950s ALSA extended its network through central and western Asturias. In 1962 the company started a route from Oviedo to Madrid, and in 1964 started its first international service from Oviedo to Paris and Brussels. The company expanded continually to become the leading Spanish road passenger transporter in the 1980s, and by 2000 covered most of Spain and Western Europe.

In 1984, operations in China began.

Towards the end of the 20th century, Alsa took over several Spanish operators, mainly Empresa Fernandez, based in León, Enatcar and Continental Auto.

In October 2005 National Express took a majority shareholding in ALSA, retaining the ALSA brand. National Express acquired ALSA's main Spanish rival, Continental Auto, in 2007.

ALSA has operated in Morocco since 1999 when it commenced operating in Marrakesh. Other operations were subsequently added in Agadir in 2010, Tangier in 2013 and Khourigba in 2015. In June 2018, it was awarded a 15-year contract to operate services in Casablanca and Rabat, Salé and Temara in a joint venture with local company CityBus.

In September 2025, it was announced that, starting in 2026, ALSA would take over UK Coach operations in the United Kingdom. Both ALSA and UK Coach are part of Mobico (the former National Express, that was renamed to Mobico in 2023).

== Fleet ==
A Saurer coach of the line Oviedo-Cangas del Narcea in 1923

In its early years the ALSA fleet was based mainly on NAG and Saurer vehicles, with some additional GMCs, and De Dion-Boutons, but in 1939/40 they bought around seven British ACLO normal control coaches, which in the early fifties were followed by eight forward control units of the Regal III model of the same make, with bodies by Seida of Bilbao.

Later, ALSA switched to an all-Pegaso buying policy, initially still with Seida bodies, and later with Monotral, Setra-Seida, Ayats and Irizar coachwork; to turn in the early 1980s to Mercedes-Benz O303 and O404 chassis with successively Maiso, Hispano Carrocera, Sunsundegui and Noge Spanish bodies.

Mercedes-Benz is still the main ALSA chassis provider, but the top-of-the-range three-axled Setras are the current flagships of the ALSA fleet, many of them in the Clase Supra top-class specification.

Most of the fleet is equipped with wi-fi, onboard toilets, air conditioning and power outlets at every seat.
