= AFA (automobile) =

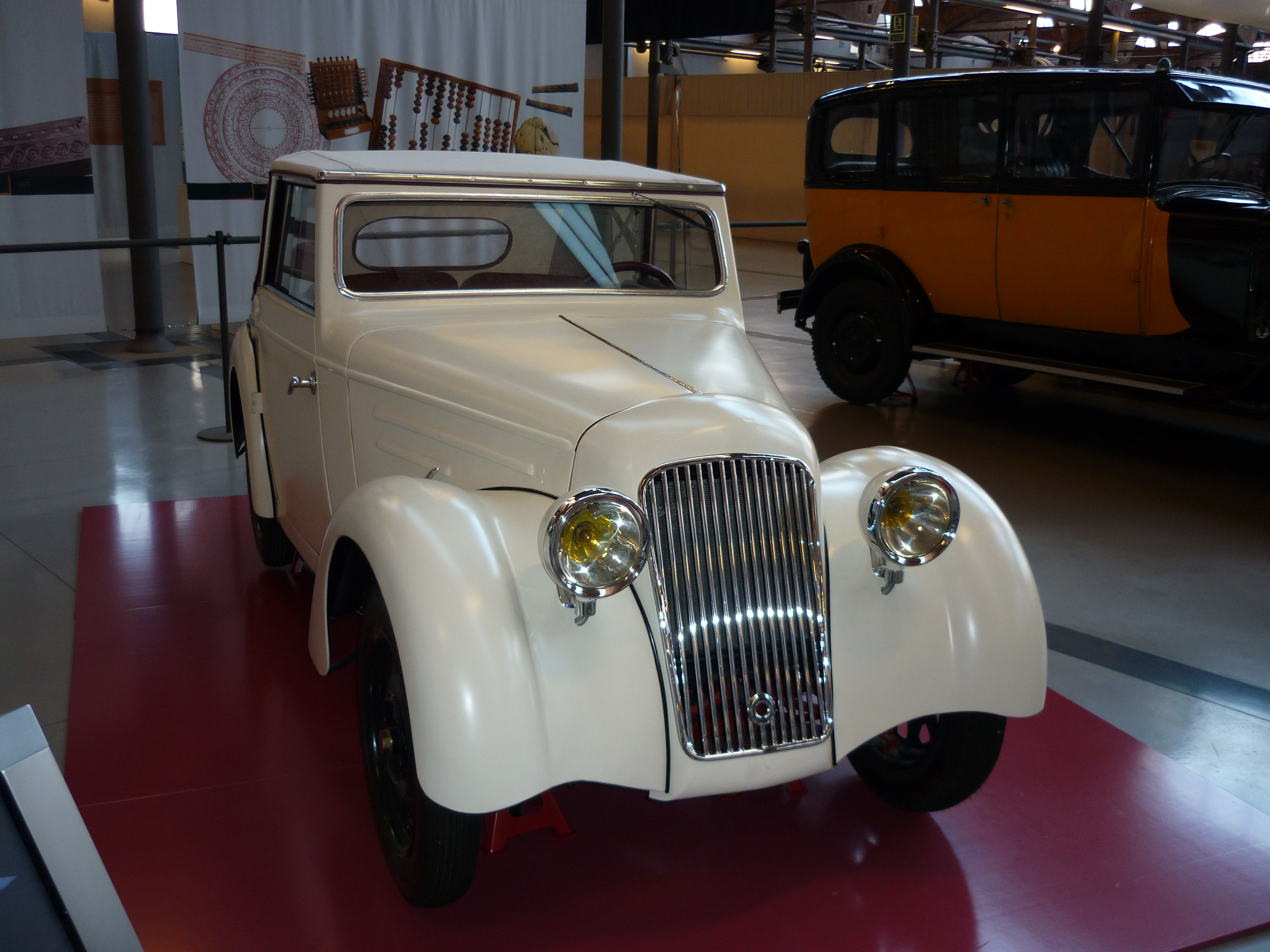
AFA 1943 car, the only car that remains exhibited at mNACTEC.

The Aymerich Fábrica de Automoviles (AFA) was a Spanish automobile manufactured between 1943 and 1944.

== Cabriolet ==
Little is known about the marque other than that a few (1 or 2) 5cv 4-cylinder cabriolets were built by Joan Aymerich Casanoves in Barcelona. The AFA was powered by a four-stroke 527 cc engine that produced 13 hp (9.7 kW) at 3,500 rpm. The AFA microcar had a manual transmission with four gears with a top speed of 85 km/h (53 mph). The AFA prototype was registered in Barcelona in April 1943, with the registration number B-72.107 and its patent number was 159,882. The company exhibited at the Exposición Automovilista Nacional in Madrid on July 10, 1944.

- Dimensions and weights:
  - Length: 3,200 mm (130 in)
  - Width: 1,320 mm (52 in)
  - Height: 1,280 mm (50 in)
  - Weight: 530 kg (1,170 lb)
  - Load: 710 kg (1,570 lb)
- Maximum speed: 85 km/h (53 mph)
- Consumption: 100 km (62 mi) with 6 L
- Acceleration: 0 to 85 km/h (0 to 53 mph) in 50 seconds

In 2008, a son of Joan Aymerich contacted the mNACTEC, Terrassa, which took the only remaining car and restored it. After three years of restoration work, the AFA is now on exhibition in the Transport collection at mNACTEC.

== Joan Aymerich Casanoves ==
In 1935, Casanoves had created the failed "National Ruby" car, due to the outbreak of the Spanish Civil War he was not able to go to production. But his experience served as the basis for the AFA. Casanoves hoped to make 100 cars annually, but only produced one or two cars. He died in 1946, and the car project was then abandoned in 1947.

== See also ==
- Automotive industry in Spain
