= MNACTEC =

National Museum of Science and Industry of Catalonia
- Museu Nacional de la Ciència i de la Tècnica de Catalunya
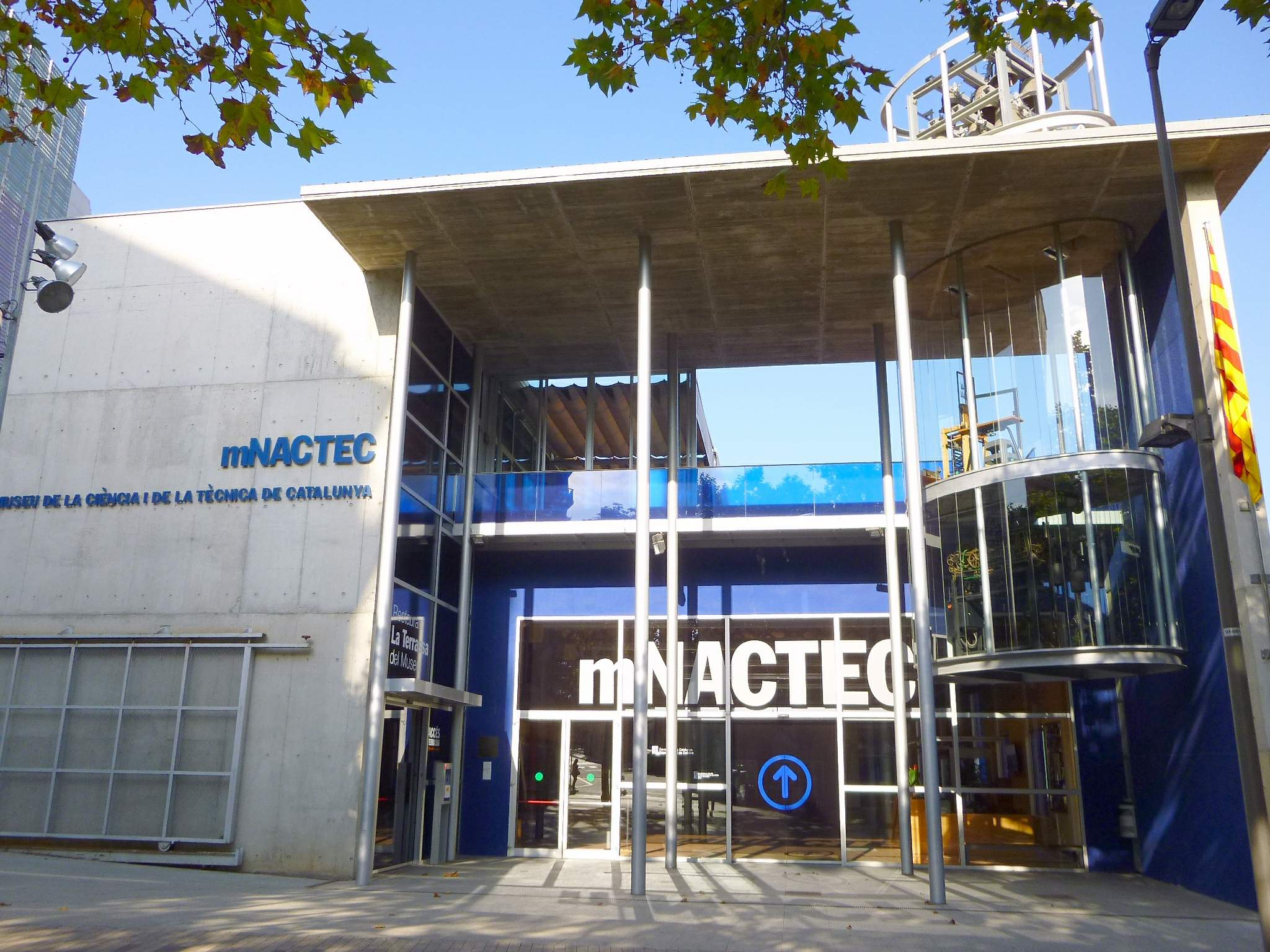
- Location: Terrassa
- Coordinates: 41.5651°N 2.0053°E
- Website: mnactec.cat/en

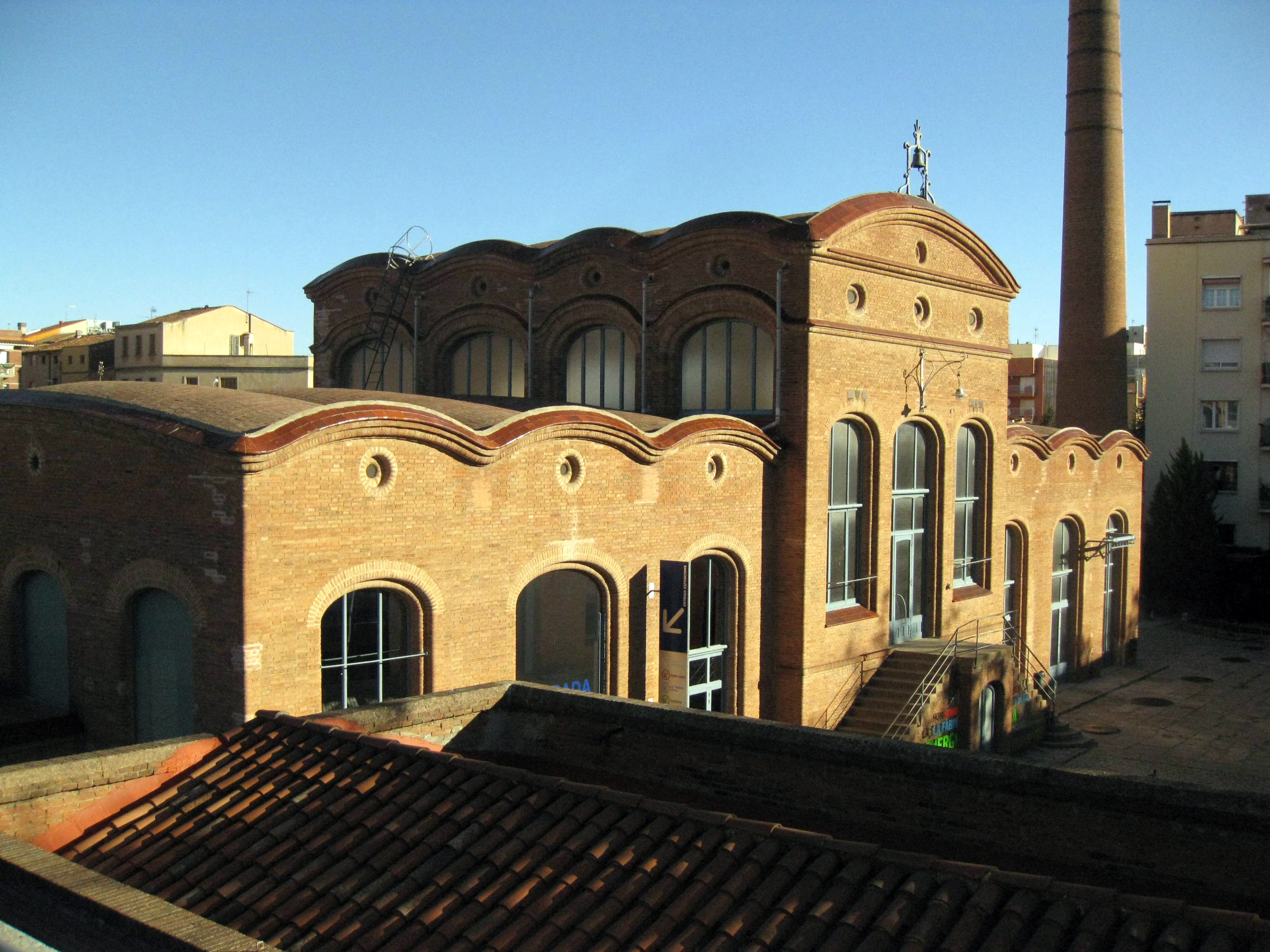

The National Museum of Science and Industry of Catalonia (Catalan: Museu Nacional de la Ciència i de la Tècnica de Catalunya) known by its acronym (mNACTEC) is one of the three national museums of Catalonia, located in Terrassa, near Barcelona. Its mission is to showcase and promote an understanding of scientific, technical and industrial culture, and furthermore to preserve, study and present the establishment and evolution of scientific and technical advances in Catalonia, their industrial application, and above all their social implications and impact. The museum is an anchor point on the European Route of Industrial Heritage.

== Building ==
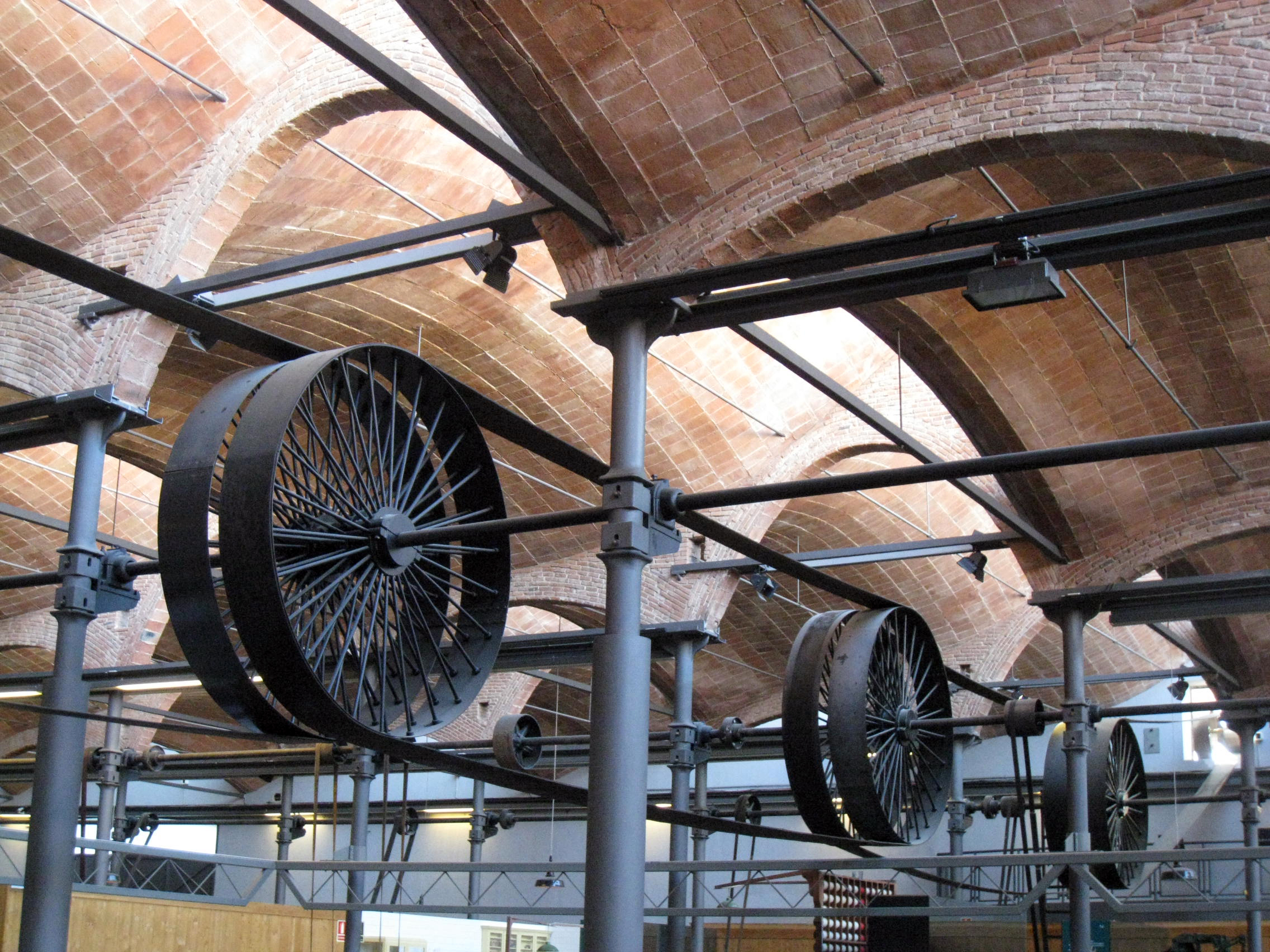
The weaving shed columns with the roof and line-shafting.

The museum is housed in the iconic Vapor Aymerich, Amat i Jover (Note: The Spanish associate a cotton mill with the steam engine (Vapor) used to drive it.) in Terrassa near Barcelona. It was designed by the Catalan architect Lluís Muncunill for Messrs Aymerich, Amat i Jover in 1909. He solved the problem of roofing the immense weaving shed with row upon row of 161 shell-shaped half arches, each with gently curving windows: this served the same function as the saw-toothed north lights in a Lancashire weaving shed. The columns broke up the usable space of the factory so had to be carefully placed around the looms. The columns functioned as rain water drainage, and held the line shafting that transmitted power from the stationary steam engine to the looms. The engine house and other parts of the building feature the Catalan vault. The factory was severely affected by the flooding of 1963 (Catalan: Riuada del Vallès) and it finally closed in 1978. It was bought by the state in 1983 and opened as a museum.

== Museum ==
mNACTEC runs several museums across Catalonia, this one specialises on textiles. The aim of the museum is to provide a comprehensive overview of the history of knowledge and technology in Catalonia, and the process of industrialisation. It starts with the Neolithic revolution, shows power generation techniques with waterwheels, electricity and turbine drives and solar technology.

=== Collections ===
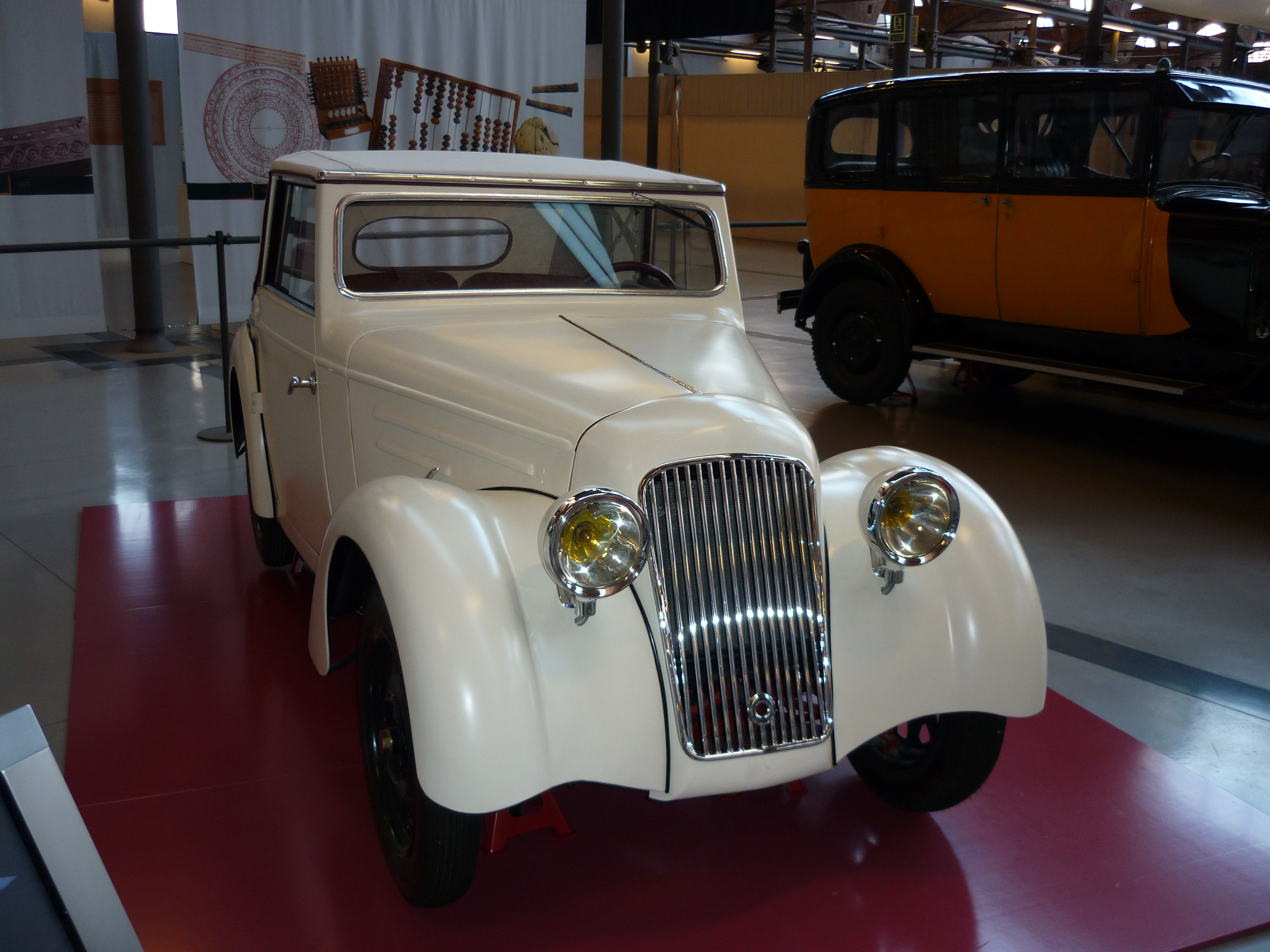
AFA 1943 car, the only AFA car that remains, exhibited at mNACTEC

Lluís Muncunill
the works of the architect
Homo Faber
evolution of technology, from Neolithic times up to the Industrial Revolution
The textile mill (La Fàbrica Tèxtil)
A complete cotton factory
Enérgeia
Energy
El transport i motos Montesa
Collection of cars, lorries, engines, aeroplanes, motorbikes and bicycles.
La terrassa del Sol
experiments investigating the power and functioning of the sun.
Mentora Alsina
Virtual visit to the physics laboratory of Ferran Alsina.
Área d'interpretació del mNACTEC
multifunctional space relating to the industry of Catalonia.
El cos humà
Interpretation of the body and the Fundació-Museu d'Història de la Medicina de Catalunya, historic medical instrument collection.
