= Indcar =

Spanish bus-frame manufacturing company

Indcar is the trading name of Industrial Carrocera Arbuciense SA, a Spanish-based coachbuilder, specialized in building mini- and midibus bodies mainly on Mercedes-Benz, Iveco and Man vans and truck chassis (although vans from other manufacturers are sometimes also used). Their products are sold throughout all of Western Europe.

The company was established in 1888 by Mr. Francesc Queralt Roca in Arbúcies, a village in the Selva county of the province of Girona, Catalonia, Spain. This small town offered the advantage of being in the midst of a densely forested area ("Selva" means "forest" in Catalan), useful since the bodyworks were made of wood at the time. It was the first of several cochbuilders to be based in Arbúcies; it would be later followed by Ayats, Beulas, Noge and Boari.

In 2013, Indcar opened a new production plant in Prejmer, Romania, where the Strada and Mobi models are manufactured.

== Products ==
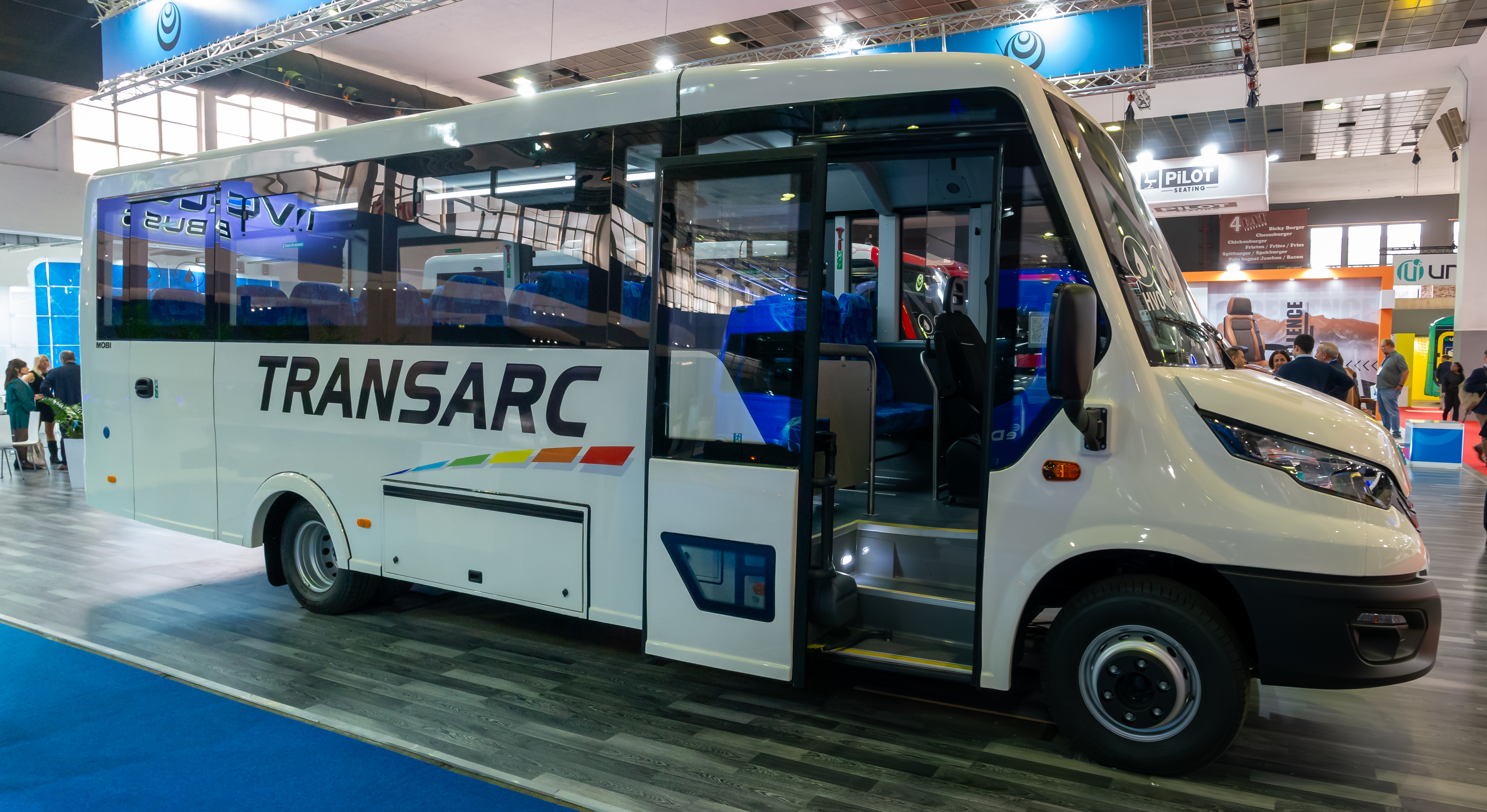
Indcar Mobi

- Cytios – urban minibus based on Mercedes-Benz Sprinter
- Mago 2 – midibus based on Iveco CC100 with up to 32 seats.
- Mago 2 Cabrio – Open-top midibus based on Iveco CC100 up to 34 seats
- Mobi – midibus based on Iveco CC100 with up to 33 seats, also available in Urban and Low Entry versions
- Next L8 – midibus based on Mercedes-Benz Atego chassis or Iveco CC100 chassis, with up to 33 seats
- Next L9 – midibus based on MAN N14 or Iveco CC150 with up to 37 seats
- Next L10 – midibus based on Iveco CC150 with up to 41 seats
- Strada – minibus based on Iveco Daily or Mercedes-Benz Sprinter
- Wing – minibus based on Iveco Daily 70C with up to 28 seats
