= Kapi (car) =

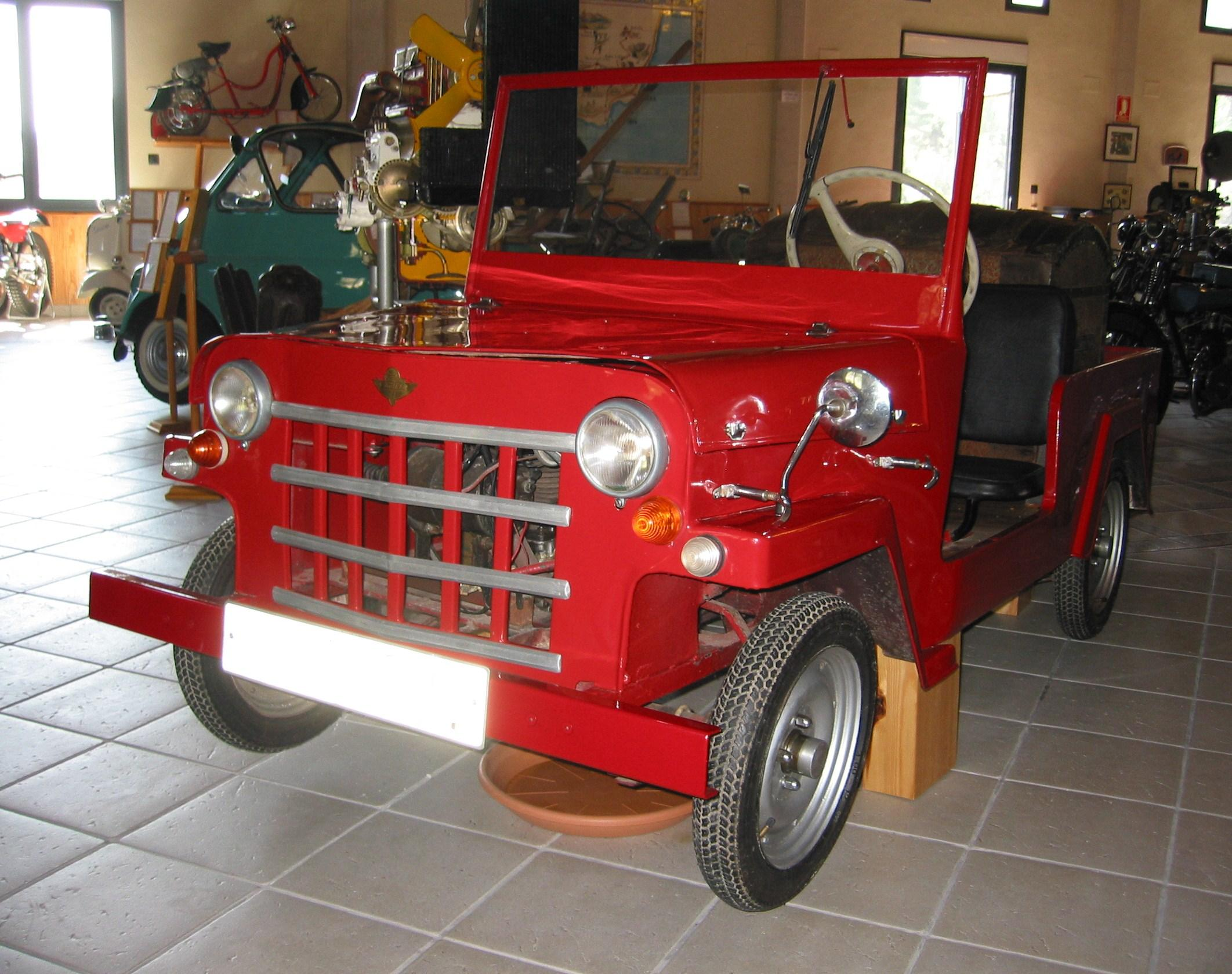
Kapi Jip.

The Kapi was a Spanish automobile manufactured by Automóviles y Autoscooter Kapi in Barcelona from 1950 until 1955. Designed by Captain Federico Saldaña, the first car was a light three-wheeled two door runabout powered by a 125 cc 2 cv single-cylinder two-stroke engine made by Montesa. The single wheel was at the front.

Other models followed including:

- the Kapiscooter with Hispano-Villiers engine
- the Jip, a miniature Jeep with 197 cc engine
- the Chiqui, a three-wheeler with single wheel at the rear
- the Platillo Volante (flying saucer), a four-wheel coupé
- the M190 with miniature Mercedes 190 body
