= Miquelets de Catalunya =

Historical reenactment society

- Founded: 2005
- Location: Spain
- Period: War of the Spanish Succession
- Earliest year portrayed: 1705
- Latest year portrayed: 1714
- Website: www.miquelets.cat

Miquelets de Catalunya is a Spanish living history and historical reenactment group founded in 2005 that reenacts several Catalan Army units from the War of the Spanish Succession. In addition to military personnel, they also portray civilian roles.

== History ==
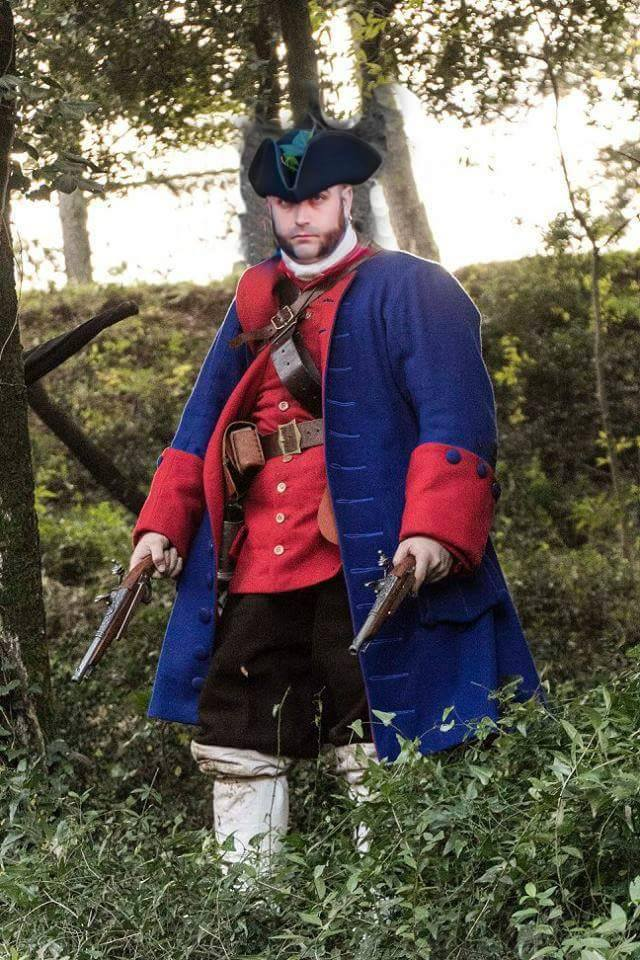
Miquelet (militia)

The group was founded in December 2005. It has been involved in several reenactment events, such as the battle of Torredembarra reenactment. It has also been present in international reenactment events, like the multi-period event Military Odyssey in Maidstone, England. and in "Times and Epochs 2017" in Moscow, Russia.

=== Name ===
The term miquelets is often used to describe several irregular Catalan and Valencian mountain light troops that fought during the 17th and 18th centuries in the Iberian Peninsula.

== Regiments and units ==
=== Deputation of the General Regiment of Infantry ===
This line infantry regiment was created in 1705 by the Deputation of the General of Catalonia, (Note: The term General means the political community of the Catalans, not the military rank.) the Catalan government.

=== Vilar Ferrer Regiment of Light Infantry ===
This regiment was created in 1710 by colonel Juan Vilar Ferrer.

=== San Jorge Regiment of Cuirassiers ===
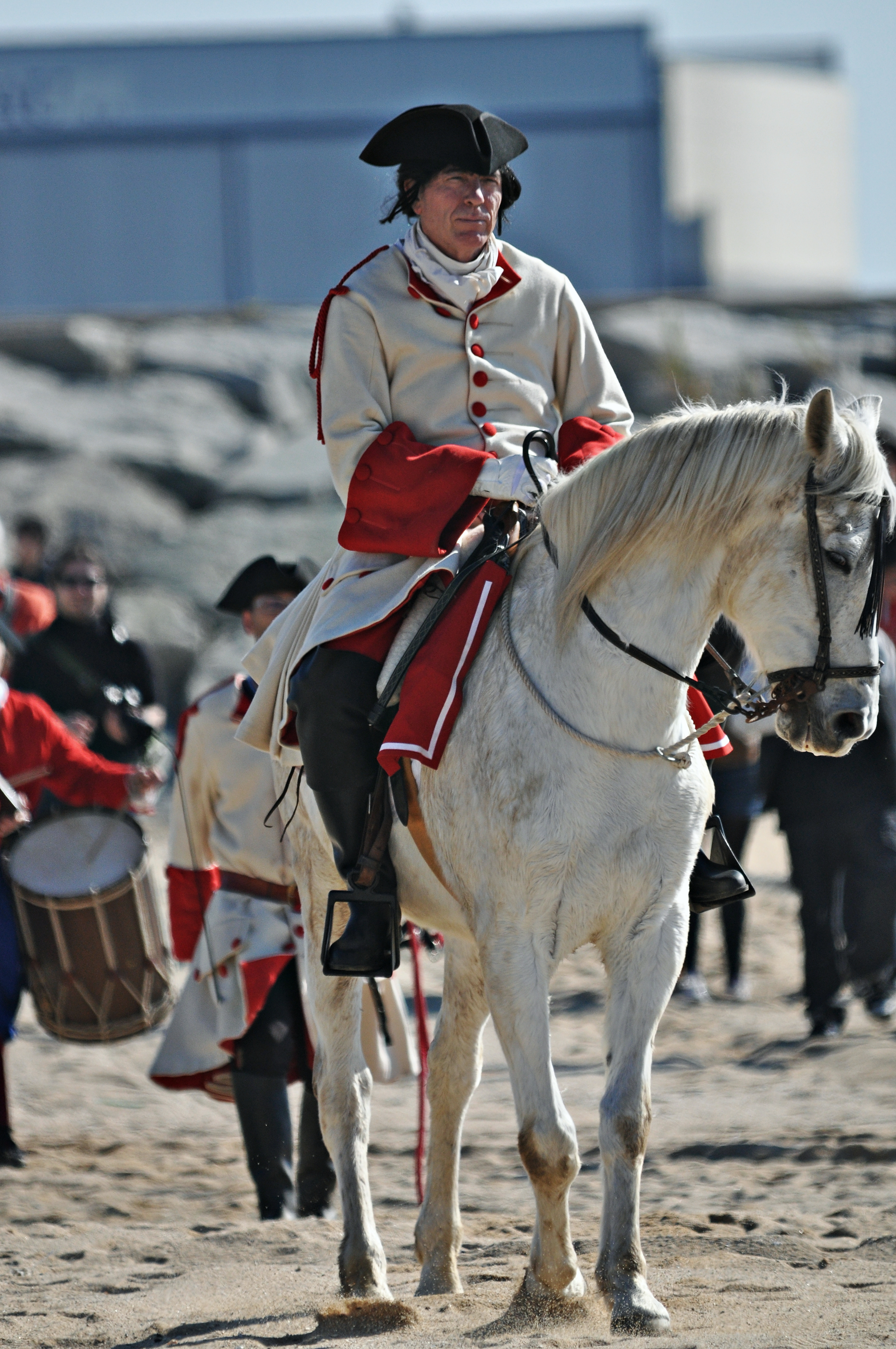
Reenactment of a San Jorge Regiment's cuirassier.

This regiment, named after Saint George (the patron saint of Catalonia), was created in July 1713 under the command of the Leautenant Colonel José Comes, a veteran of the Catalan Royal Guard of Charles VI, Holy Roman Emperor. This regiment participated on numerous episodes during the siege of Barcelona.

== See also ==
- Miquelets de Girona

== Bibliography ==
- Hernández Cardona, Francesc Xavier; Riart, Francesc (2007). Els Exèrcits de Catalunya (1713-1714). Uniformes, equipaments, organització (in Catalan). Barcelona: Rafael Dalmau Editor. ISBN 978-84-232-0713-8.
