= Eucort =

Former Spanish automobile manufacturer

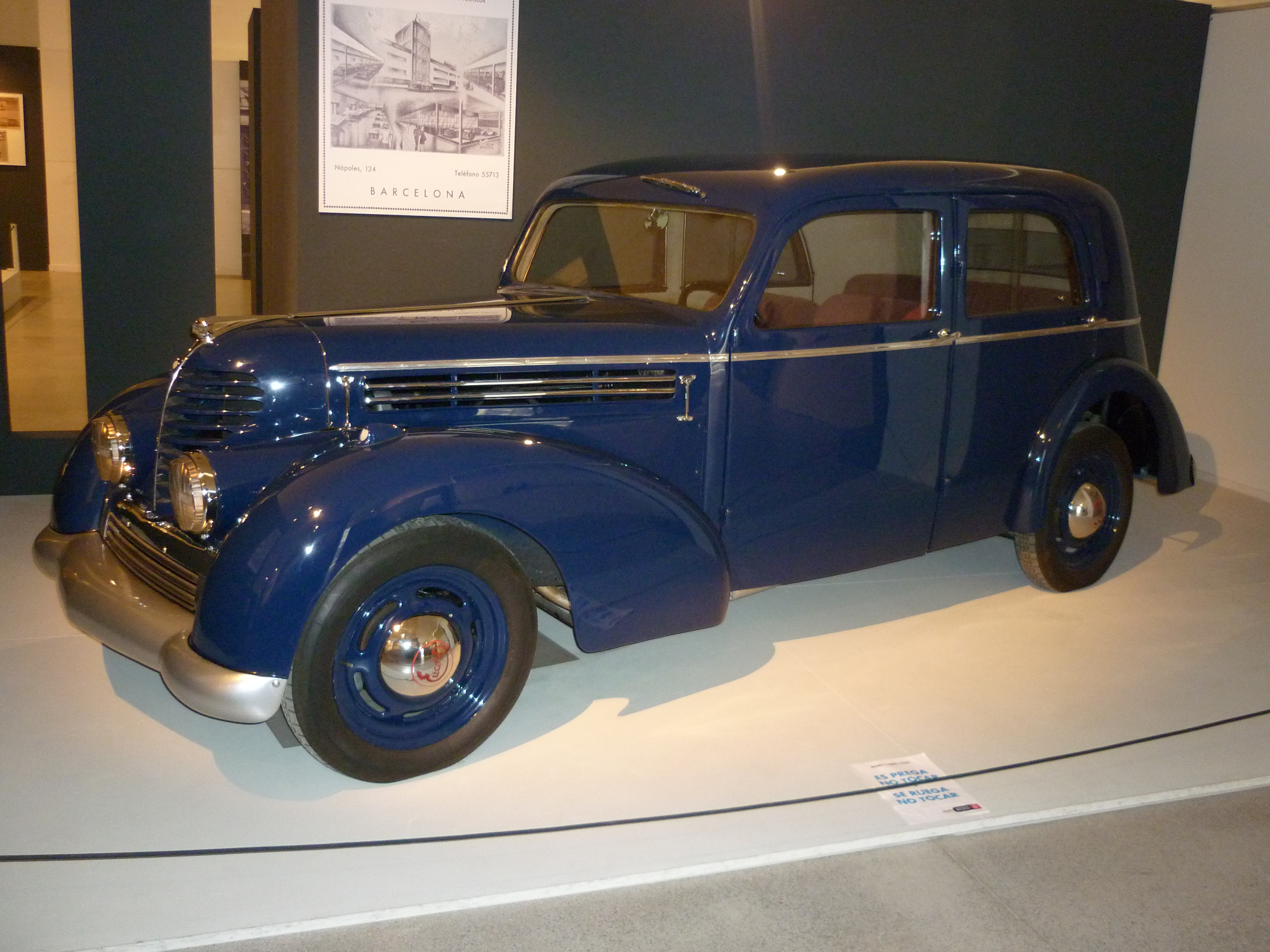
Eucort Turismo, 1947

Eucort (Eusebio Cortés SA) was a Spanish automobile manufacturer based at Barcelona from 1945 till 1953.

An attempt at creating a "popular car", the first Eucort was based on a prewar DKW design. It featured a 764 cc twin-cylinder two-stroke engine. Output of 23.5 bhp (17.5 kW) was claimed for this model. DKW inspiration was also apparent from the front-wheel-drive layout. The car was available both as a conventionally styled four-door sedan and as a three-door estate.

The last new model was the Victoria of 1950, which had a 1,034 cc three-cylinder engine. Still two-stroke, the engine in this application boasted an output of 31 bhp (23 kW). By 1951, when the firm ceased production, approximately 1,500 Eucorts has been produced, including taxi and cabriolet versions. The business subsequently went into liquidation.
