= Ayats =

Spanish bus manufacturer

Carrocerías Ayats S/A
- Type: Societat Anònima
- Industry: Bus manufacturing
- Founded: 1905
- Founder: Joan Ayats
- Headquarters: Central services Paratge Can Call, km. 1 17401 Arbúcies, Catalonia
- Website: ayats.es

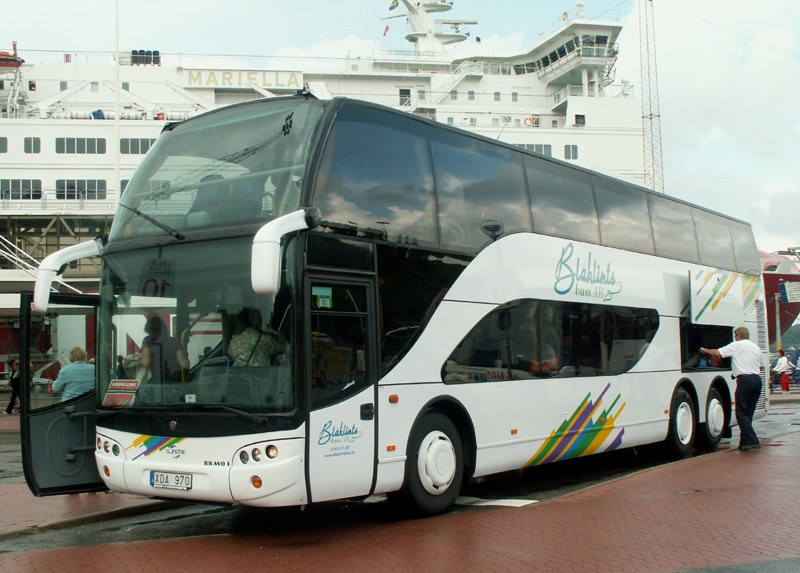
Ayats Bravo 1 coach on a Scania chassis

External image
- Ayats bodied Pegaso Z-401 coach (c.1953)

Ayats is the trading name of Carrocerías Ayats SA, a Spain-based coachbuilder. The company constructs a range of coach bodies on a variety of chassis, and also manufacture their own integral products. Their products are used throughout Europe. The company was established in 1905 by Mr. Juan Ayats in Arbúcies, a village in the Selva county of the province of Girona, Catalonia, Spain. This small town offered the advantage of being in the midst of a densely forested area ("Selva" means "forest" or "jungle" in Catalan), useful since the bodyworks were made of wood at the time. Ayats is one of several coachbuilders based in Arbúcies; others include Indcar (the oldest of them), Beulas, Noge and Boari.

Ayats Bravos have been used for a number of years as the platform for specialist double deck coaches including open top buses and sleeper buses. The Ayats Bravo City was the first purpose-built open top low-floor tour bus, introduced by the worldwide sightseeing operator City Sightseeing.

== Products ==
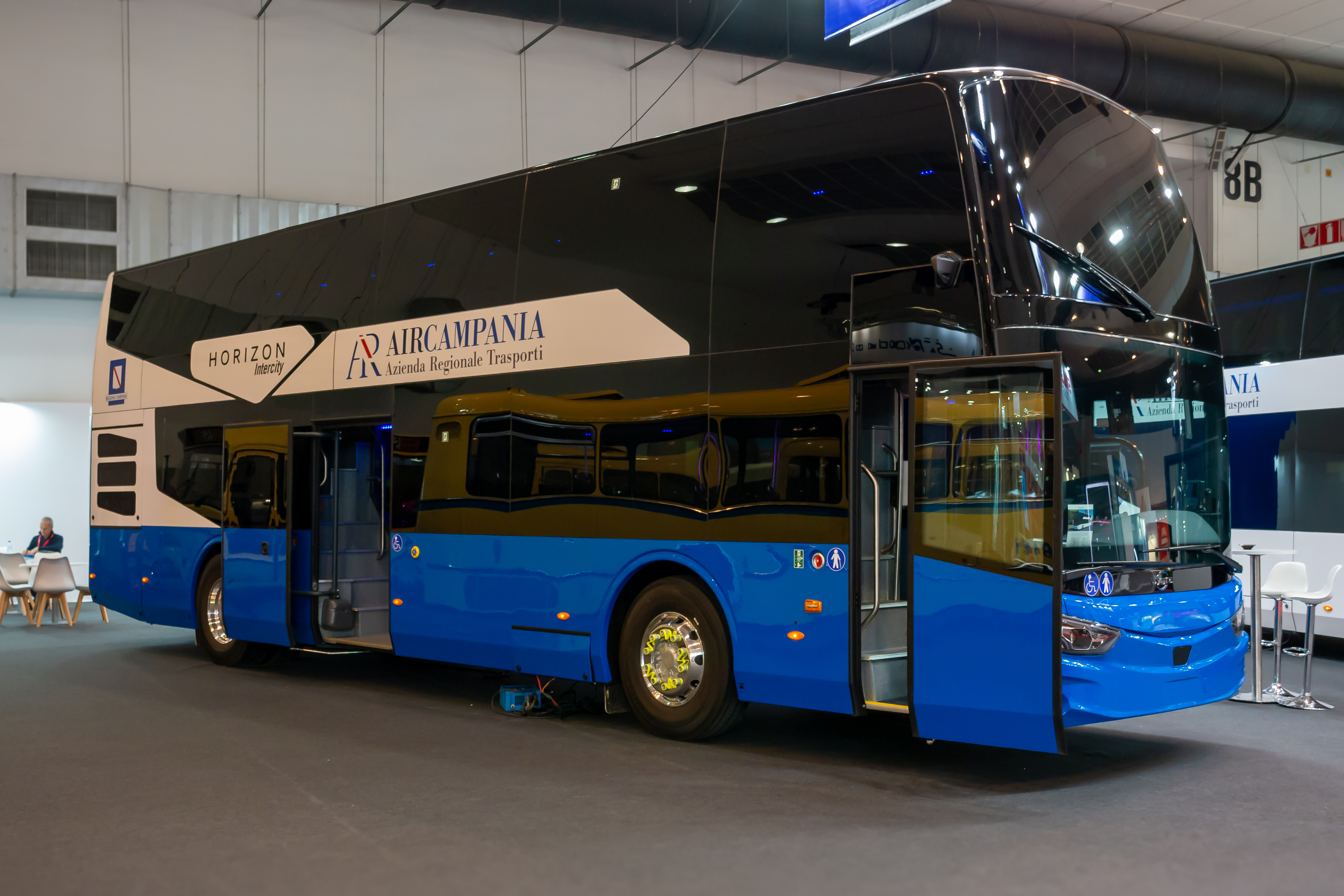
Horizon Intercity

- Atlantis
- Atlas 2
- Ayats Air256
- Ayats Bravo
  - Bravo 1
  - Bravo 2
  - Bravo 3 (the unofficial name for the Bravo 1 with the Megaloader walk-in loading bay).
  - Bravo City/Urbis
- Ayats Horizon
- Platinum
- Ayats Eclipse
- Jupiter
- Olympia
