= Nogebus =

Spanish coachbuilder

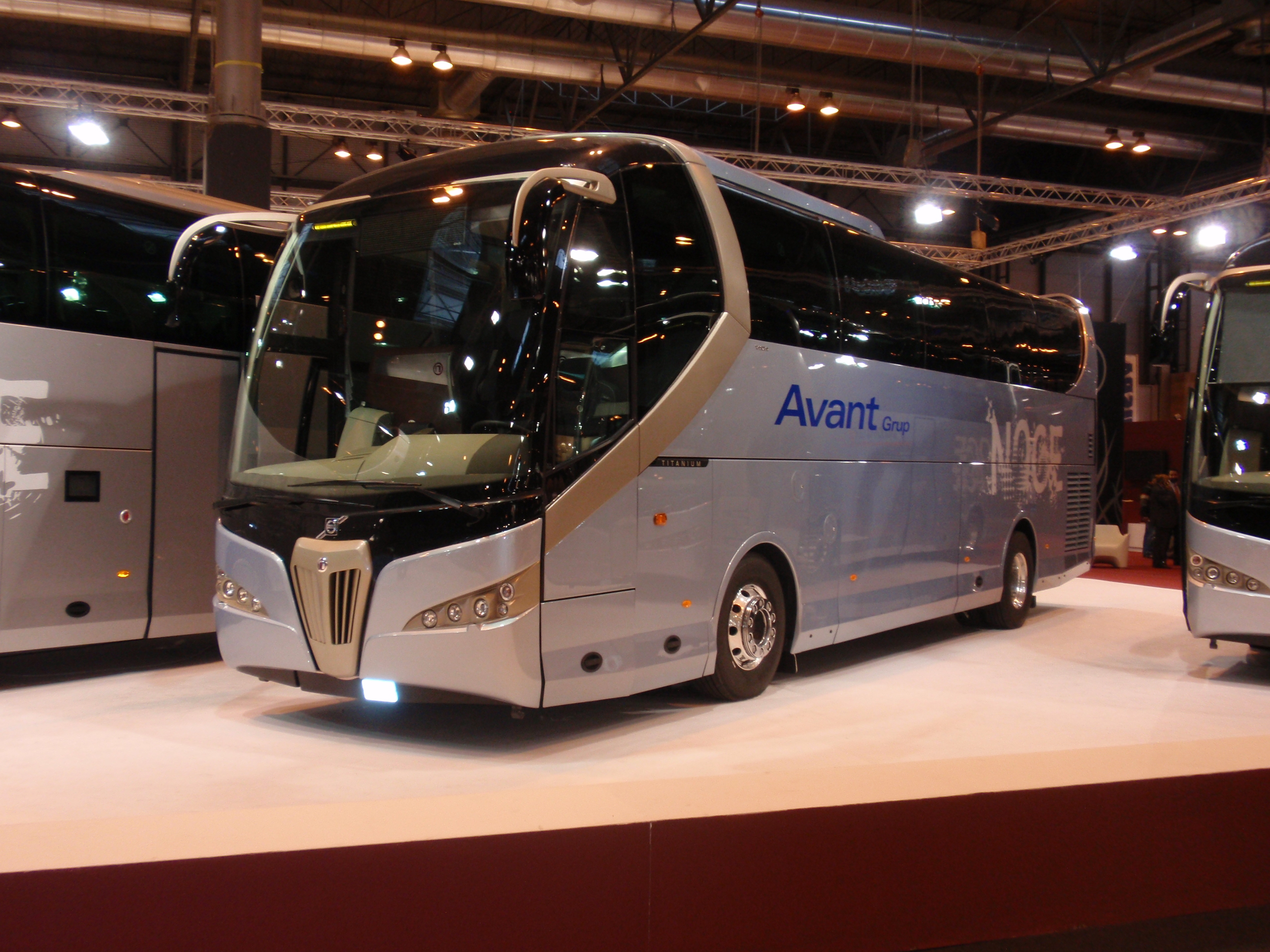
Noge Titanium coach built on a Volvo chassis at the 2008 FIAA (International Bus and Coach Fair) in Madrid

Nogebus was a Spain-based coachbuilder. The company builds bus and coach bodies on various different chassis. Their products are sold throughout all of Western Europe.

The company, originally named Noge, collapsed in January 2013. However, later that year it was acquired by another Catalan company, Sartruck, and resumed its activities.

Noge was, after Indcar, Ayats and Beulas, the fourth coachbuilding company to be founded in Girona, Catalonia. It was established in 1964 by a former Ayats worker, Miquel Genabat Puig (whose son presides the company today) and by Josep Noguera, who dissociated himself from the company in 1978. Noge began its activities building city buses but soon expanded to intercity and luxury coaches as well. In its heyday, the company had over 250 employees and produced an average of 600 vehicles a year. The workforce had been reduced to 93 by the time the factory temporarily closed in early 2013. 22 of these workers were rehired by the new company Nogebus. By the time activities restarted in July 2013, the company had 32 employees, and an objective of building 60–70 coaches per year, initially only for Spanish operators and later for other European markets.

On November 17, 2022, Nogebus filed for insolvency proceedings. In August 2023 Nogebus went into liquidation.

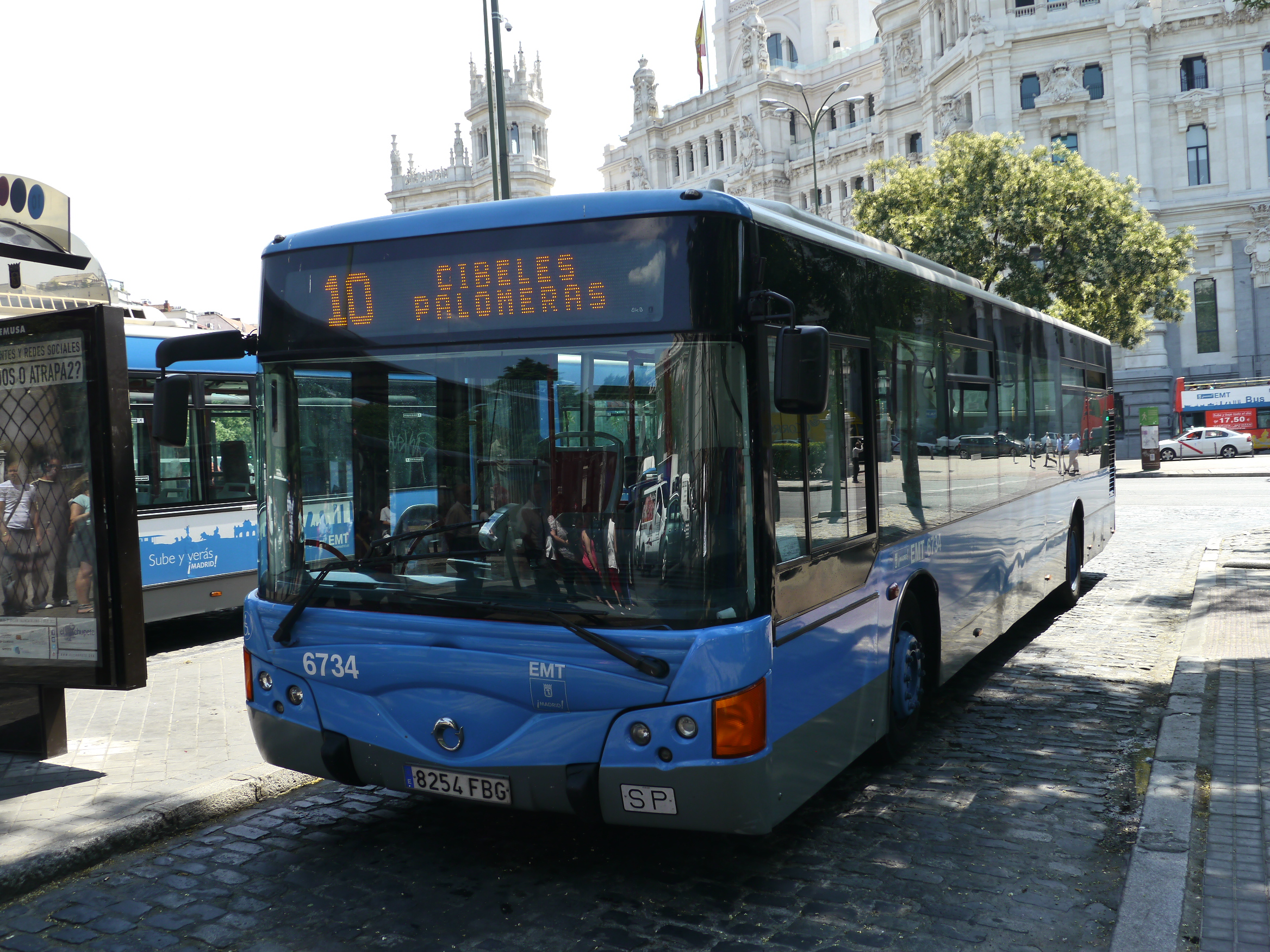
A city coach operated by the EMT of Madrid.

== Products ==
- Cittour - city bus
- Aertour - airport shuttle bus
- Touring - coach
- Titanium - luxury coach
