= List of Spanish automobiles =

This is a list of current and defunct Spanish automobiles, listed by manufacturer.

== Current companies ==
- Aspid
- Cupra (marque)
- Beulas (Bus & Coach)
- Comarth (Electric Vehicles)
- Hurtan
- Irizar (Bus & Coach)
- Mazel (Concept Cars)
- SEAT (Only major Spain automobile company)
  - 124
  - 127
  - 128
  - 131
  - 132
  - 133
  - 600
  - 800
  - 850
  - 1200
  - 1400
  - 1430
  - 1500
  - Alhambra
  - Altea
  - Altea XL / Freetrack
  - Arosa
  - Ateca
  - Córdoba
  - Exeo
  - Fura
  - Ibiza
  - Inca
  - León
  - Málaga
  - Marbella
  - Ronda
  - Terra
  - Toledo
  - Trans
- Tauro (Sports Cars)
- Tramontana (Sports Cars)
- Uro (trucks) (Civil/Military Trucks)

== Defunct companies ==
=== A-D ===
- Abadal (1912–1923; 1930)
- AFA (1943–1944)
- America (1917–1922)
  - A
  - B
  - C
  - D
- Anglada (1902–1905)
  - Castro
  - Tobajas
  - Ultramovil
- Authi (1966–1976)
  - Mini
  - Mini 850
  - Mini 1000-E
  - Mini 1000-S
  - Mini Cooper 1300
  - Mini Van
  - Morris 1100
  - Morris Traveller
- Avia (1956-1980s)
  - 2500
  - 3500
- Barreiros (1951–1969)
  - Cóndor
  - Panter
  - Puma
  - Simca 1000 automático
  - Simca 1000 GT
  - Simca 1000 Rallye Gr2
  - Simca 1200 GLS (90 octanos)
  - Simca 1200 campero
  - Star
- Biscuter (1953–1958)
  - 200 C
  - Pegasin
- Ceyc (1923–1931)
- Clúa (1959–1960)

=== E-I ===
  - Electric vehicles, with Trojan batteries: (1914-1965)
    - Cross Rider
    - Model TS
- Dagsa (1954–1955)
- David (1914–1922; 1951–1957)
  - Torpedo 2.5
  - Torpedo 2 S
- Diaz y Grilló (1914–1922)
- Ebro (1954-1980s)
  - C 550
  - F-108
- El Fénix (1901–1904)
- Elizalde (1914–1928)
  - 11
  - 20
  - 29
  - 48
- España (1917–1928)
- Eucort (1946–1953)
  - Eucort rural
  - Sedán 3 cilindros
  - Victoria Avión
  - Victoria Rubia
  - Victoria Sedán
- Hispano Aleman (1970–1976)
- Hispano-Guadalajara (1918–1923)
- Hispano-Suiza (1904–1968)
- Hisparco (1924–1929)
- Ideal (1915–1922)
- IPV (1963-2006)
- Izaro (1922-19??)

=== J-Z ===
- Kapi (1950–1955)
  - Ampurias
  - Barcino
  - Chiqui
  - Kapiscooter
  - Jip
  - M190
  - Platillo Volante
  - Tarraco
  - Turisa
- La Cuadra (1898–1902)
- Landa (1919–1931)
- M.A. Alvarez (????-????)
- Matas/SRC (1917–1925)
- Nacional G (1939–1940)
- Nacional Pescara (1929–1932)
- Nike (1917–1919)
- Orix (1952–1954)
- Otro Ford (1922–1924)
- Pegaso (1951–1957)
  - Pegaso I
  - Pegaso II (Z-202)
  - Pegaso Diesel (Z-203)
  - Z-102
  - Z-103
  - Z-207
  - Z-403
  - Z-501
  - 352
  - 3020
  - 3045
  - 3050
  - 3545 BLR
  - 3550 VAP
  - 3560 BMR
  - 3562 VEC
  - 5070
  - DAF 95
  - Monotral
- P.T.V. (1956–1962)
- Ricart-Pérez (1922–1926)
- Ricart (1926–1928)
- Ricart-España (1928–1930)
- Santana (1956-2011)
  - 300
  - Aníbal
- Sava (1957-1980s)
- TH (1915–1922)
- Triver (1953-1984)
- TZ (1956-1969)
- Victoria (1919–1924)

== See also ==
- List of automobile manufacturers
- List of car brands
- List of motorcycle manufacturers
- List of truck manufacturers
