= Wifredo Ricart =

Spanish engineer (1897–1974)

Wifredo Pelayo Ricart Medina
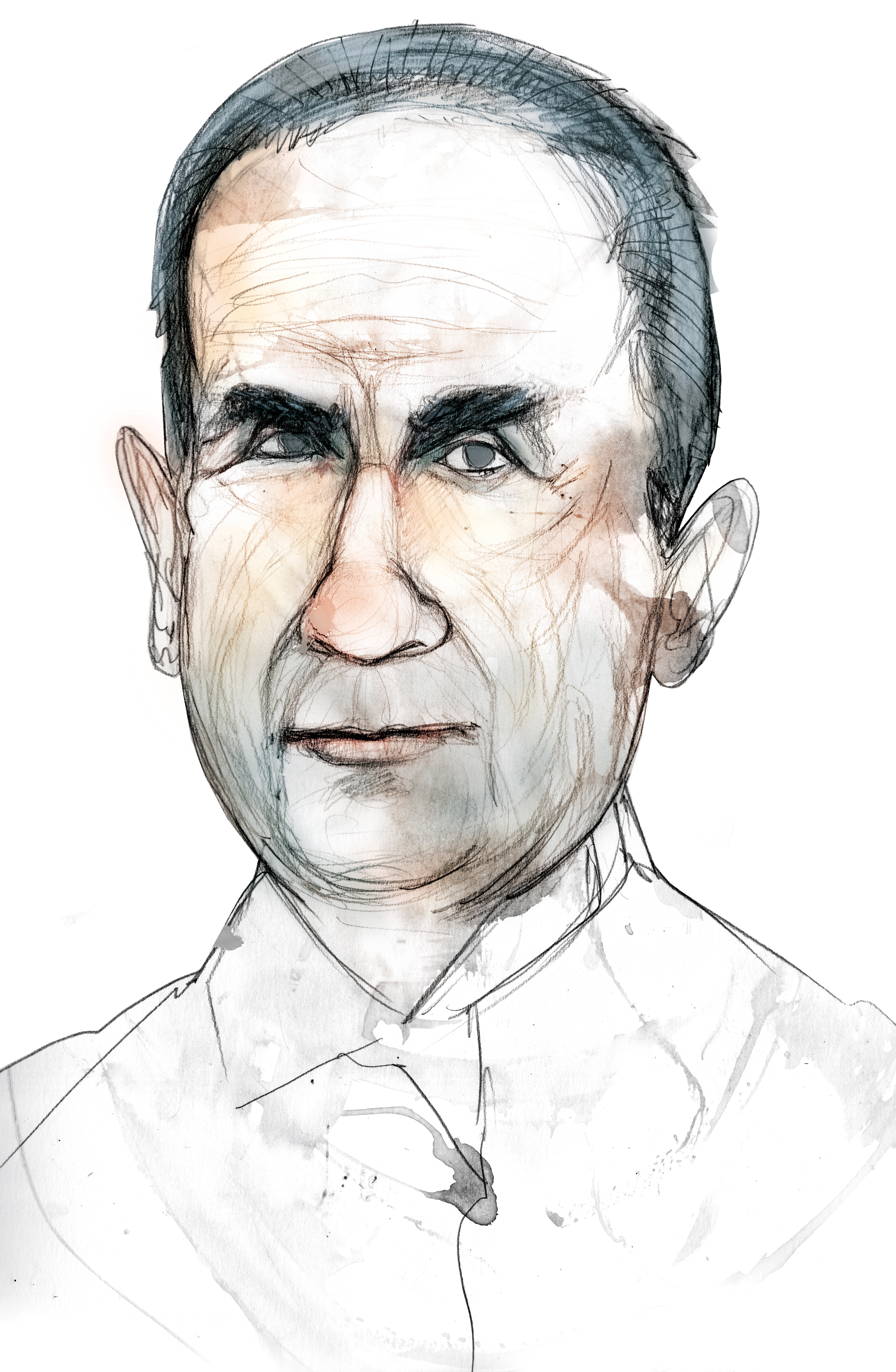
- Born: 15 May 1897; Barcelona, Spain
- Died: 19 August 1974; Barcelona, Spain

Wifredo Pelayo Ricart Medina (15 May 1897 – 19 August 1974) was a Spanish engineer, designer and executive manager in the automotive industry, who spent his professional career in Spain and Italy.

== Barcelona "Happy Twenties" ==
Born in Barcelona, Ricart graduated in 1918 as an industrial engineer. His first job was in a Hispano-Suiza dealer, but he soon moved to a new company, Motores Ricart-Perez, that successfully produced industrial engines.

At that time, in the wake of Hispano-Suiza's automotive success, Barcelona swarmed with automotive initiatives. In this technically exciting environment, Ricart became increasingly interested in automobile engineering, and in 1922 designed his first car. It featured a 4-cylinder, 16-valve 1.5-liter engine which was advanced for its time. Two of these cars ran in the Barcelona Grand Prix for voiturettes, one winning its second race, a few months later.

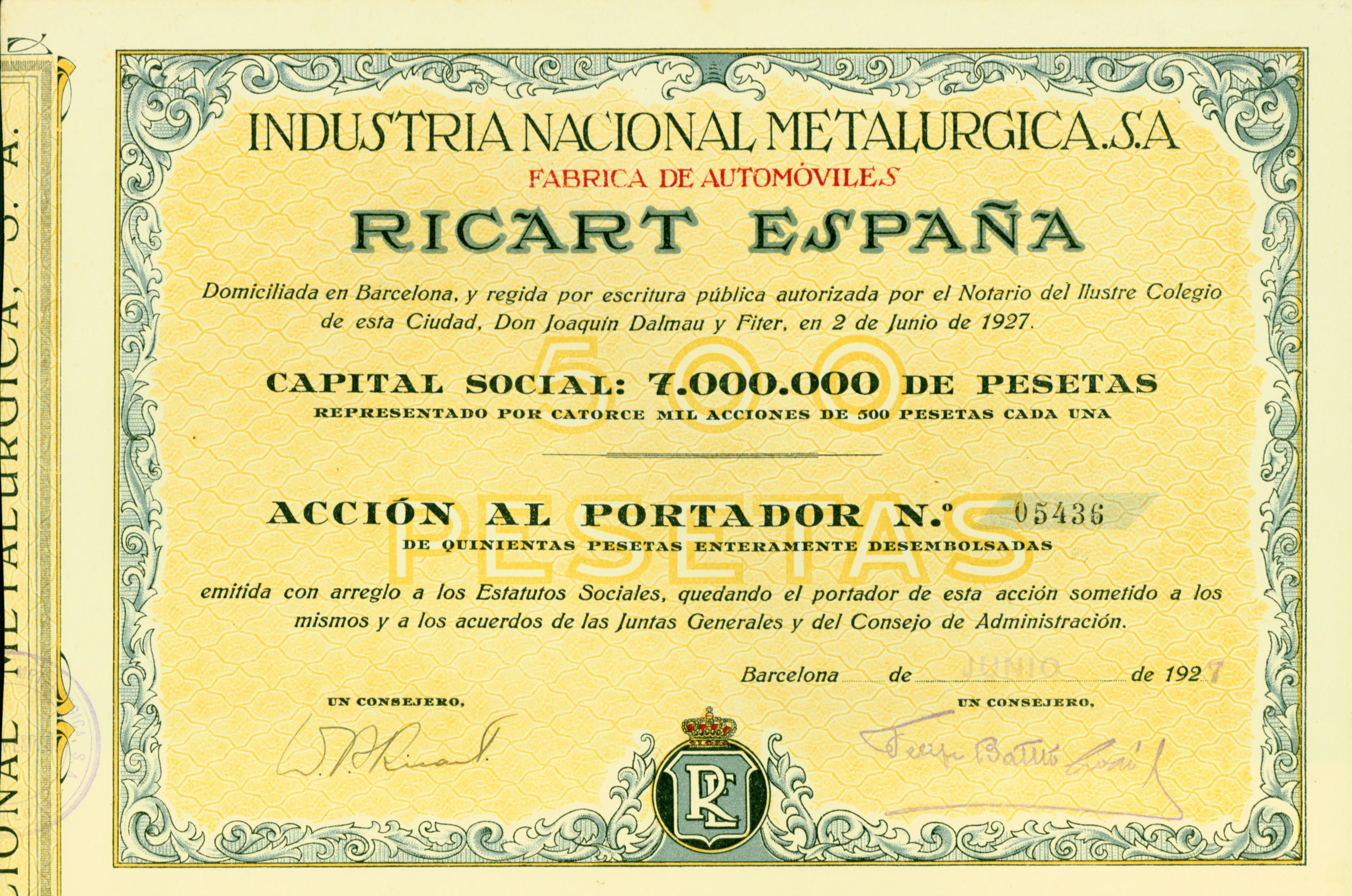
Share of Ricart-España, issued June 1927

In 1926, Ricart founded his own company, Motores y Automóviles Ricart, and in October presented two prototypes of the new Ricart car at the Paris Motor Show, gaining a lot of attention. Nevertheless, financial difficulties compelled Ricart to merge his company with the one of industrial tycoon Felipe Batlló, to produce cars under a new brand, Ricart-España. It was for this company he designed a new model addressed to the high segment of the market, with a 2.4-liter 6-cylinder engine. Again this venture failed due to the general economic slump.

In 1930, Ricart became a member of the American Society of Automotive Engineers and he established himself as an independent consultant, working for different European firms.

== Italian period ==
In 1936 he started to work for Alfa Romeo, as Chief Engineer for Special Projects. He remained in Alfa for eight years, the most professionally fruitful in his life, aside from his time, later on, at Pegaso.

In Alfa Romeo he designed and developed many engines, from aviation to racing cars. There he met Enzo Ferrari, and it seems the two characters did collide somehow, for Ferrari evidently blamed Ricart for being fired from Alfa Romeo before World War Two:

There was no doubt what [Enzo] Ferrari thought when he heard [in 1951] that a Spanish lorry manufacturer was building cars fit to rival his. Ferrari had a long memory, and still smarted over his dismissal from Alfa Romeo before the war. He blamed this on a certain engineer [Wifredo Ricart], and in a famous outburst criticized this engineer's designs for an engine whose crankshaft 'revolved like a skipping rope,' and a racing car which was 'outdated, good only for scrap or a museum' (and moreover, killed its test driver). "With sleek, oiled hair and smart clothes that he wore with a somewhat levantine elegance,' Ferrari wrote afterwards, 'he affected jackets with sleeves that came far down below his wrists, and shoes with enormously thick rubber soles.' The reason for the thick soles, this engineer explained to Ferrari, was because, 'A great engineer's brain should not be jolted by the inequalities of the ground and consequently needed to be carefully sprung.' It said a good deal more for Guifré Ricart's sense of humour than Enzo Ferrari's that he was taken seriously. Even Vittorio Jano described Ricart as a man of profound intellect. It is true that some of his designs were monuments of complexity, sometimes even impractical, but the same was probably said of Leonardo da Vinci. His fatal Alfa Romeo 512 was a horizontally opposed 12 cylinder, rear-engined racing car with a centrifugal supercharger giving 335 bhp from 1.5 litres. He had already abandoned the Type 162, which was a 3 litre planned to give 560 bhp, with two carburettors, 3 stage supercharging with five compressors, 16 cylinders, and 64 valves. By 1940 he was working on a 4-bank 28 cylinder radial aero-engine, and the following year designed a unitary construction road car for postwar production with all independent suspension, a twin-cam 2 litre engine, and a gearbox integral with the final drive — a radical layout not unlike that eventually adopted for the Alfetta Coupe of 1974.

== Back to Spain. Building Pegaso ==
In 1945, with Italy devastated by the II World War, Ricart returned to Barcelona, and shortly he managed to be hired by the American Studebaker corporation, but just before leaving for the US, he was proposed to lead the creation of a new Spanish automotive group, Enasa, to be built over the remainings of the Spanish arm of Hispano-Suiza. He accepted, and for several years he struggled to get a modern, technically advanced, car and truck maker from a country, materially and morally devastated from the Civil War.

In the early fifties, the results of Ricart's efforts were visible: In October 1951, in the Paris Motor Show a newcomer attracted all the looks; it was a sophisticated sports car, the Pegaso Z-102. While the primary objective, the Enasa creation which was the massive industrial vehicles production, Z-102 served to demonstrate the company's technical capabilities. Ricart had the Pegaso Diesel and Z-207 trucks, the Z-403 and Z-404 coaches or the Z-501 trolleybus, and the new from scratch Enasa plant in Barajas (Madrid) were a success, situated at Spanish automotive industry in the best starting point to cope with the economic development Spain, which undertook in the 60s and 70s. He was the author of patents for some 'Unusual Engines', as ES140010; ES117737; ES118013; ES118261; ES272123; GB476647A; FR590149A, an aviation turbine, the British style, with centrifugal compresor, ES176177.

== Final years ==
Ricart resigned as Enasa CEO in 1959, criticized for paying more attention to technical innovation than to economic realities. From then on he returned to his free lance consultant activities, as he was widely recognized as one of the most skilled and experienced automotive engineers. In his last years he increased his significant collaboration with several professional bodies, like S.A.E., FISITA, and S.T.A. He served as President of FISITA, the International Federation of Automotive Engineering Societies, from 1957 to 1959.

He died in Barcelona in August 1974.
