= El Fenix =

El Fenix can refer to:

- El Fénix (automobile), a Spanish automobile
- El Fenix (restaurant), a Tex-Mex restaurant chain based in Dallas
- El Fenix Cafe, an independent Tex-Mex restaurant in Abilene, Texas
