= Clúa =

Spanish motorcycle and automobile brand

Construcciones Mecánicas Clúa S.L.
- Type: Private limited company
- Industry: Automotive, Motorcycles
- Founded: 1949
- Founder: Joan Clúa
- Defunct: 1962
- Fate: Bankruptcy
- Headquarters: Barcelona, Spain
- Products: Motorcycles, Tricycles, Microcars

Clúa was a Spanish motorcycle and automobile brand by Construcciones Metálicas Clúa from 1949 to 1962. The company was owned and founded by Joan Clúa i Maluquer. Its headquarters was located at 6 Avenida de Pau Casals, Barcelona, Spain, at the time called Avenida General Goded, and the assembly line was located at Carrer d'Espronceda.

Clúa manufactured its first motorcycle, the MC-75 in 1951. It had a wide range of motorcycles and tricycles (50, 75, 125 and 175 cc). In 1955 they began to manufacturing a roadster type microcar.

== Motorcycles ==
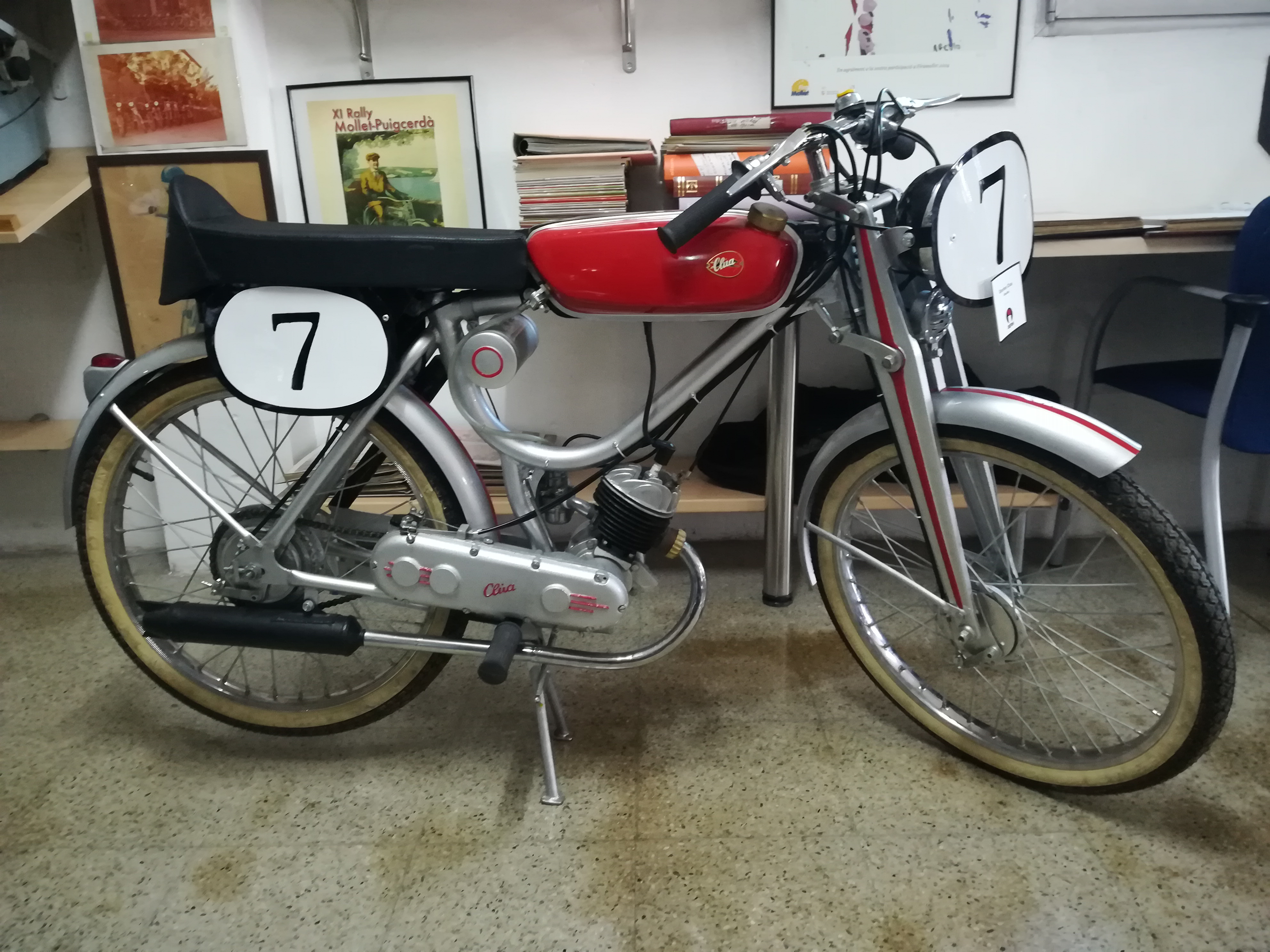
1954 Clúa Gorrión 50cc

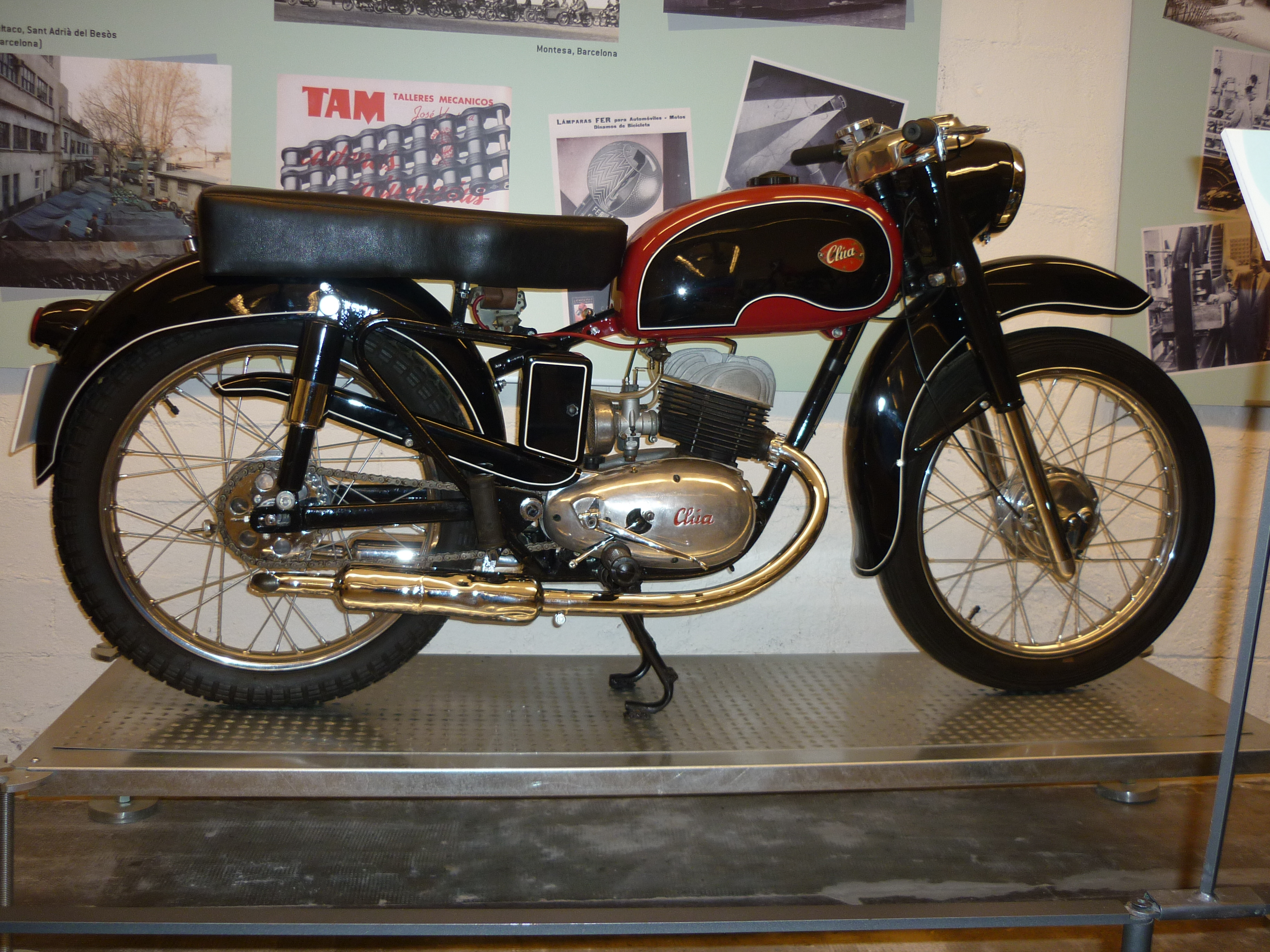
1955 Clúa Sport 125cc

They made their first motorcycle, the MC-75 in 1951, powered by a two-stroke single-cylinder engine with an output of 3.25 hp at 5,800 rpm. The piston had gas deflector with aluminium and graphite grey casting cylinder in chromium-nickel alloy. The fuels system was fed through by a constant level carburettor and automatic regulator. The oil was mixed at 6% on benzine. It had a three-speed gearbox with hand control, simple steel tubular frame, with telescopic fork front suspension and rear telescopic twin with helical springs, inclined in the direction of the gait. It also had a 8-litre fuel tank with consumption of 2 litres per 100 km and a top speed of 70 km/h (43 mph).

In 1952, the model was revised, starting with shorter stroke ratio and better stability, it also changed the colour of body and the engine with an increased output of 4 hp at 5,500 rpm as well as single disc clutch and front fork suspension with hydraulic action. It top speed was decreased to 65 km/h (40 mph).

By 1953 the range had been expanded with the 125cc model, equipped with the new Hispano Villiers two-stroke monobloc engine, with an output of 6.5 hp, aluminium cylinder head, flat-head piston and a Hispano Villiers carburettor. Mixture of gasoline and oil was increased to 16% and intake by a magnetic flywheel. Transmission was done via two-plate clutch with oil-bath oil-plated cylinder heads and a 3-speed gearbox with foot control. It weighed around 80 kg. Fuel consumption was 2.5 litres per 100 km with a top speed of 80 km/h (50 mph).

In 1954 the "125-Rapita" was added to the model range, identical to the previous 125cc but with a custom 123.5cc two-stroke monobloc engine instead of the Hispano Villiers one. Set with a gasoline and oil mixture of 8%. Equipped with a 3-speed gearbox. It had a 14-litre fuel tank with fuel consumption of 2.5 litre per 100 km and a top speed of 90 km/h (56 mph). The 125cc model was manufactured until 1958.

While retaining the same 125cc engine, in 1955, it was fitted with a new oscillating rear suspension frame, which gave it a more agile performance. This new version had an output 7 hp and gasoline and oil mixture of 8%. It was offered with either a 3-speed or 4-speed gearbox. The chassis was made of weldless stretched steel tube.

The 74 cc model was introduced in 1957 and the last new model the company would make. Equipped with a 7:1 compression motor with an output of 3 hp at 6,500 rpm. Gasoline and oil mixture was set at 9% and intake by magnetic flywheel with 4mm timing belt. It 3-speeds with foot control, front suspension with heavy crankshaft and rear suspension with oscillating fork. It had a top speed of 70 km/h (43 mph).

In 1958 the 125 cc model was equipped with a new monotube and printed sheet metal. It now only offer with a 4-speed gearbox. The price of this motorcycle was 17,850 peseta.

== Microcar ==
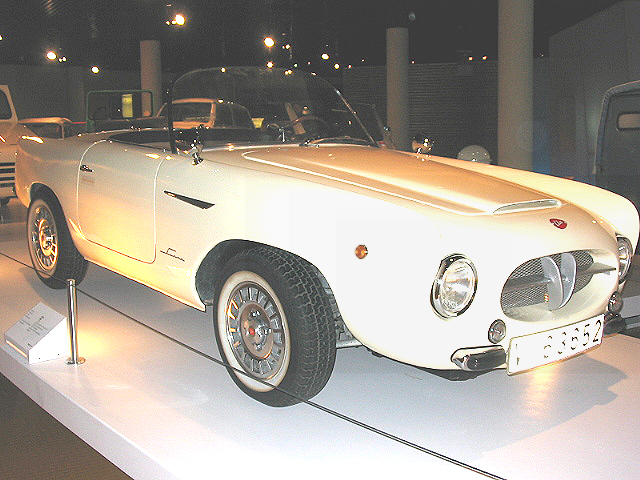
Clúa 500

In 1955, they undertook the project of manufacturing a small roadster type car called the Clúa 500, initially equipped with a 250cc two-stroke twin-cylinder engine (later increased to 350cc and 400cc) with front-wheel drive, four-speed gearbox, electric start, centre beam chassis, independent suspension and 4.50 x 10 wheels.

In 1956, a 497cc four-stroke twin-cylinder engine was offered, producing 17 PS (12.5 kW) at 5000 rpm and a top speed of around 75–80 km/h (47–50 mph). The plastic body was designed by Catalan coachbuilder Pedro Serra, best known for his design of the Biscúter Coupé (or Pegasín). Serra's design was inspired by the Pegaso Z-102.

Priced at 64,000 peseta, it was presented at the 1957 Barcelona Trade Fair with success and large number of orders were placed. The product came with a guarantee of a full refund if the product was found to be defective. Build quality related problems occurred with the sheet metal not measured properly due to a defect caused by the metal manufacture where Clúa sourced from. As a result, Clúa was forced to refund all customers who ordered one. The last example was sold for 49,300 peseta in 1960 and in 1962, the company went bankrupt. An estimated 100 examples were produced.

== Literature ==
- Walter Zeichner: Kleinwagen International. Motorbuch-Verlag, Stuttgart 1999.
- Harald H. Linz, Halwart Schrader: Die große Automobil-Enzyklopädie. BLV, München 1986, ISBN 978-3-405-12974-3.
