= Otro Ford =

Overview
- Manufacturer: Otro
- Production: 1922–1924
- Assembly: Spain

Body and chassis
- Class: Automobile
- Body style: Various (based on Ford Model T)
- Layout: Front-engine, rear-wheel-drive
- Related: Ford Model T, Maiflower

The Otro Ford was a Spanish automobile manufactured from 1922 until 1924. As its name implied, it was heavily based on the Ford Model T, and was similar to the English Maiflower.

The De Vizcaya brothers acquired several Ford Model T vehicles that were manufactured in Spain. They then added modifications to them, including the lengthening of the chassis as well as a radiator reminiscent of a Rolls-Royce.
