= Triver =

Triver was a Spanish car brand made by Construcciones Acorazadas SA in Bilbao (also known as Automotores Triver) from 1953 to 1962. Construcciones Acorazadas SA ceased business in 1983 after devastating floods.

== Company history ==
The company Construcciones Acorazadas SA was located in Bilbao, Spain. Its primary business was manufacturing safes and metal furnishings. From this, it branched into making stationary motors, pumps, and a diesel- or oil-powered 24cc 2-stroke motor for bicycles, called the Fraso. In 1948, the company obtained a license to manufacture small cars. The license was ratified in 1953 by the Vizcaya Industry Delegation and required the company to produce at least 50 units.

The cars, brand-named Triver by Construcciones Acorazadas SA, were designed in 1953 by Antonio de Sopeña e Irabien, the company CEO, who was also an industrial engineer. Development commenced in 1954, and production in 1957. Production ended in 1960 after around 75 cars were made. Only one vehicle remains in existence.

== Development of the Triver ==
In 1953, a four-wheel prototype was made. The two rear wheels were spaced together. Its body was handmade from 2 or 3 mm-thick sheet metal. It had no rear window. Motive power was from a proprietary EMB-type two-cylinder opposed 339cc engine located just in front of the two rear wheels. Initial tests of the prototype were unsatisfactory, forcing significant redesign work and delaying production.

== Vehicles ==
=== Rana (prototype) ===
The first model was a tricycle, with the single wheel at the rear (there is disagreement between sources as to whether or not this was the case). An air-cooled two-cylinder two-stroke engine, which was manufactured by Construcciones Acorazadas SA under the type designation EMB as a boxer engine, provided the drive. The 60 mm bore and 60 mm stroke resulted in a displacement of 339 cm³; the power was 14 hp. The design-related maximum speed was specified as 60 km/h. With a wheelbase of 160 cm, the vehicle length was 265 cm and the vehicle height was 137 cm. Only one car, the prototype, was built to this specification.

=== Rana 500 ===
The production model from 1955–62 had four wheels, but outwardly resembled the tricycle. The two-cylinder engine from Hispano Villiers had a displacement of 500 cm³ and developed 14 to 16 hp. The top speed was 78 km/h. The track width was 126 cm at the front and only 54 cm at the rear. Despite the shorter wheelbase of 154 cm, the vehicle was slightly longer than the tricycle, at 267 cm. The width was 146 cm, the height 140 cm. 75 of these were made.

=== Cervato (prototype) ===
In 1959, work began on a new prototype, the Cervato, powered by the same 500cc two-stroke motor as the Rana. It had a wider rear track and better capacity for four passengers than the Rana. Its bodywork was made of a mixture of fiberglass and plastic resin. The luggage compartment was separate from the passenger compartment, being front-engined. It had heating, ventilation, an anti-fog system, adjustable front seats, and a radio. The gasoline and oil tanks were separate, incorporating an automatic mixing device. Due to an economic downturn, work on this project ceased in 1960, and by 1962, all car production by Construcciones Acorazadas SA ended.

== Literature ==
- Harald H. Linz, Halwart Schrader : The International Automobile Encyclopedia . United Soft Media Verlag, Munich 2008, ISBN 978-3-8032-9876-8 .
- George Nick Georgano (Editor-in-Chief): The Beaulieu Encyclopedia of the Automobile. Volume 3: P – Z. Fitzroy Dearborn Publishers, Chicago 2001, ISBN 1-57958-293-1 . (English)
- George Nick Georgano: Cars. Encyclopédie complète. 1885 à nos jours. Courtille, Paris 1975. (French)
