= Pegaso Z-103 =

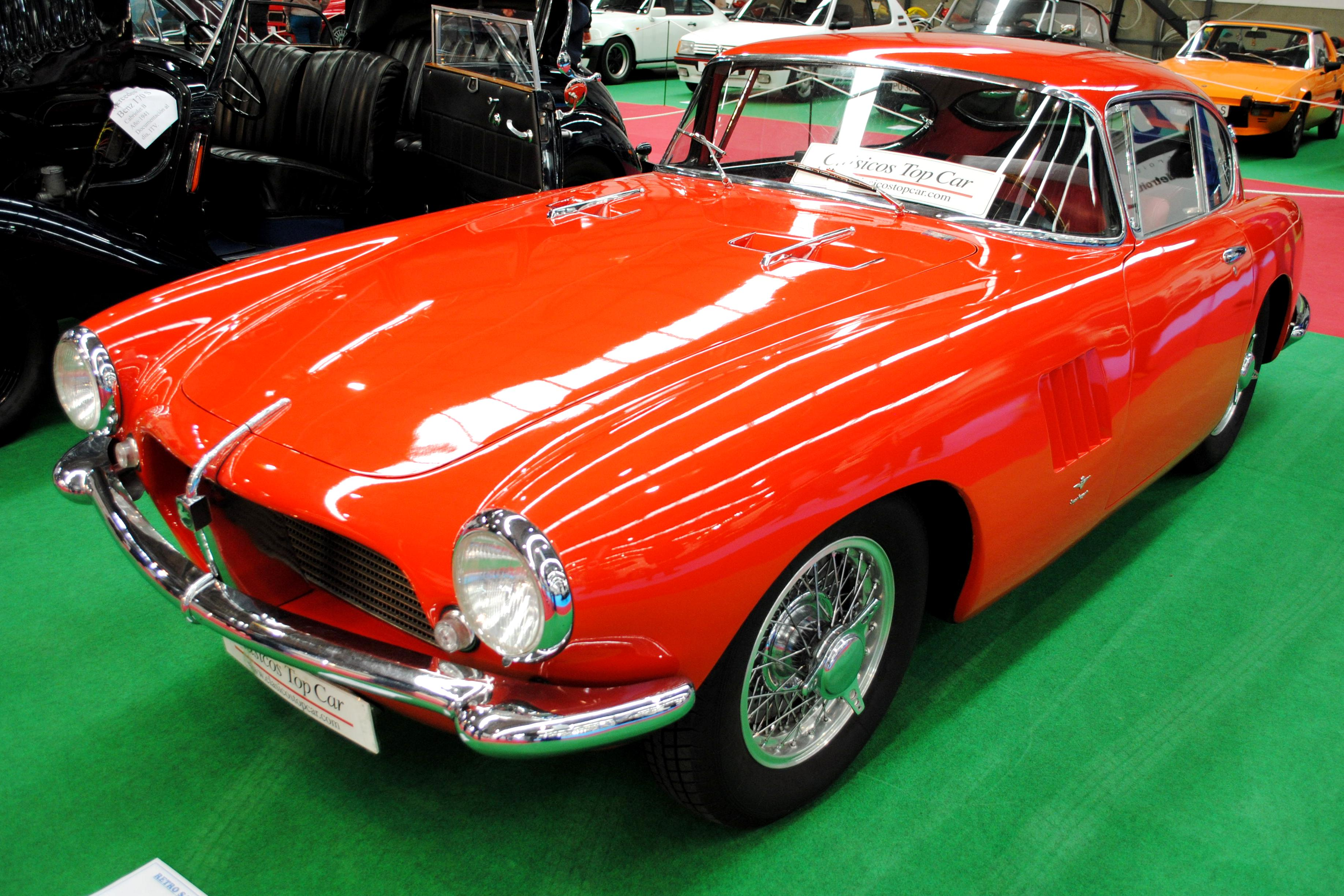
- 1955 Pegaso Z-103 Berlinetta Panorámico by Touring

Overview
- Manufacturer: Pegaso
- Production: 1955–1958 (3 produced)
- Designer: Carrozzeria Touring, Serra

Body and chassis
- Class: Sports car
- Body style: 2-door coupe 2-door convertible
- Layout: FR layout

Powertrain
- Transmission: 5-speed manual

Chronology
- Predecessor: Pegaso Z-102

The Pegaso Z-103 is a Spanish sports car produced by Pegaso from 1955 to 1958. The Z-103 was the second, and last, sports car made by Pegaso before the company switched their focus back to commercial trucks. The car had little success and only 3 were known to have been built. A Z-104 sedan had also been in the works but the idea never reached fruition.

== History ==
The Z-103 was introduced in 1955 as a successor to the Z-102, the company's previous offering. The Z-103 was supposed to use a range of higher displacement V8 engines that swapped the Z-102's complex overhead cams for a simpler overhead valve set up. The construction remained the same as the old model with bodies constructed from part steel, part aluminum.

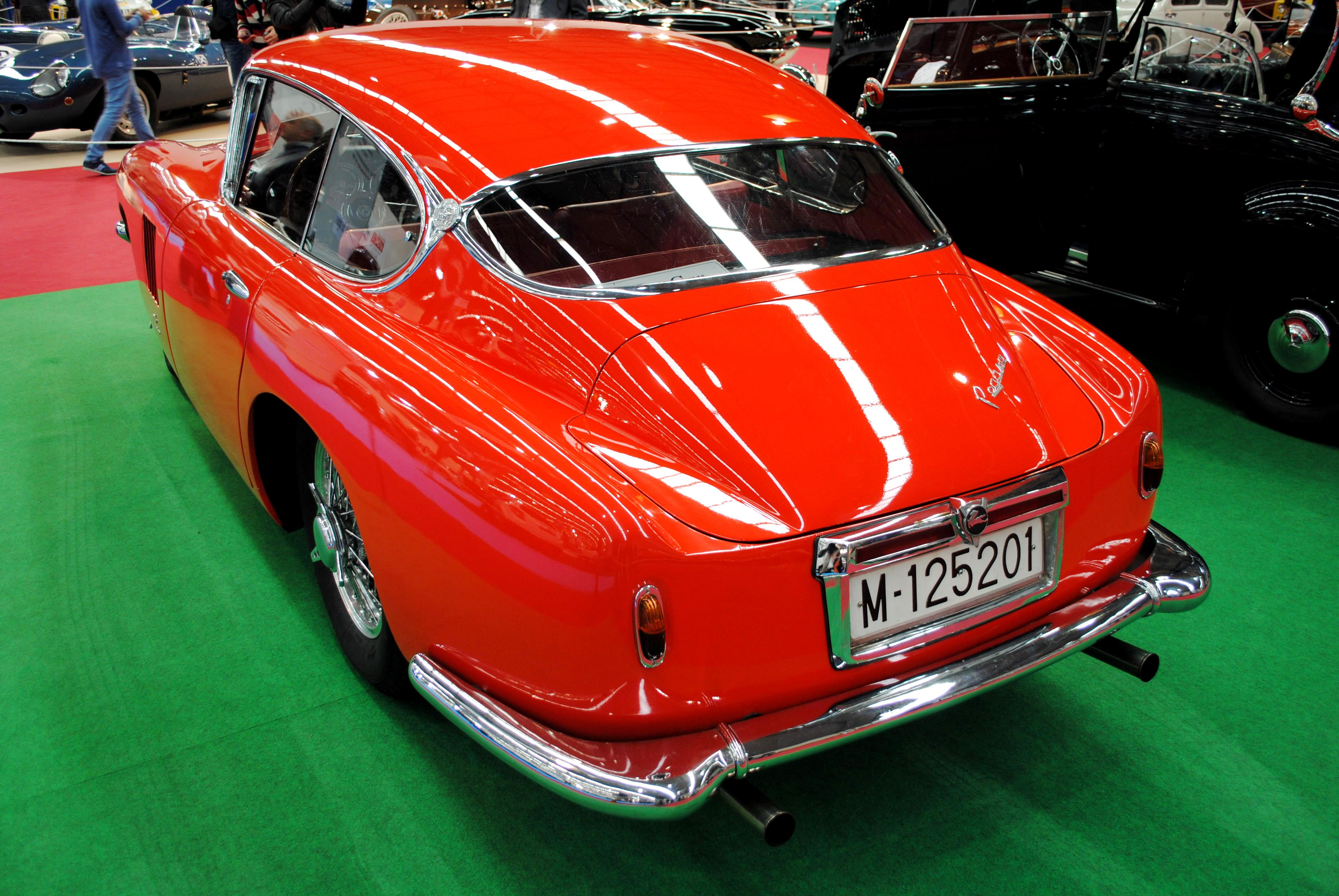
1955 Pegaso Z-103 Berlinetta Panorámico by Touring rear view

== Performance ==
Pegaso had planned to offer the Z-103 with a choice of a 3.9, 4.5 or 4.7 liter V8 engine, which could be equipped with an optional supercharger. One engine, equipped with upgraded carburetors and an optional supercharger, reportedly produced 350 bhp (260 kW) and was claimed to be capable of reaching an even higher top speed than its predecessor of 171 mph (275 km/h).

== Production ==
Production estimates for the Z-103 vary but most sources say only 3 original cars were built, one of which was a convertible and another an engine-less press car used for auto shows. Additionally, another Z-103 was assembled in 1962 from spare parts leftover from the production of the original cars.

== Continuation models ==
In 1988, financiers of the country enlisted the help of British design firm IAD (International Automotive Design) to create a continuation model of the Z-103 to promote Pegaso trucks. IAD changed certain details about the original in order to make the replica a better and safer car to drive, as well as to comply with current legislation. They were powered by an all aluminum 3.9L Rover V8 mated to an Alfa 75 transaxle and the bodies were based on the 1955 Z-103 Spider by Serra. IAD had plans to build around 60 but only 11 were built in total.
