= Maiflower =

English automobile

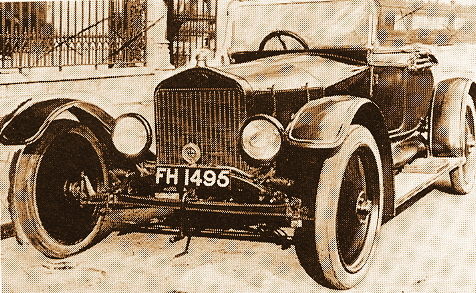
1920 Maiflower

The Maiflower was an English automobile manufactured from 1919 until 1921 in Gloucester by or for The Maiflower Motor Company. Named for the partners who built them, army captains Campbell Gwynne Price and Arthur Isaac Flower, the car was based on the Model T Ford, although a newly fabricated rear end and alterations to the front transverse suspension provided variations on the standard Ford chassis. Two and four seat tourer and coupé bodies were offered.

Price and Flower's partnership was dissolved as of 4 February 1922 and Price was to continue in the same business at Commercial Road, Gloucester.

== See also ==
- List of car manufacturers of the United Kingdom
