= Pegaso Z-403 =

- Pegaso Z-403 Monocasco brochure page.

Body and chassis
- Floor type: Step entrance

The Pegaso Z-403 Monocasco was a two-level monocoque (chassisless) coach, fitted with a 125 hp (93 kW) diesel engine asymmetrically mounted amidships, designed in 1949 and built in Spain by Enasa between 1951 and 1957.

The first Z-403 body design dates back to 1949. It brought notable contributions to passenger service for its safety and comfort and was considered an "auto-pullman" by virtue of its great comfort and its amenities. In the standard version it was equipped with radio, bar, and a small bookcase.

The Z-403 featured a single chassisless structure which allowed a better use of space, with all the mechanical units located in the underside of the vehicle, isolated from the passenger compartment.

Its split-level deck greatly improved the passengers' view and allowed for considerable luggage space. Its concept answered to the creation of a vehicle with a total length of 10 metres (32 ft 10 in), capable of transporting 30 to 45 seated persons depending on the comfort desired, and with good visibility. For greatest comfort, independent front-wheel suspension was used, with transverse arms and torsion bars.

The high resistance to flexion and torsion of the single-structure was ensured by the elements which made up the monocoque: the exterior covering of light, easily changeable metal panels. The ceiling and even the ornamental band under the windows were also structurally important parts. The body was made of steel profiles covered laterally with 1 millimetre (0.039 in) thick steel sheets combined with 1.5 mm (0.059 in) thick corrugated sheets of light alloy. The roof was made entirely of light alloy.

The Pegaso Diesel engine with 125 hp (93 kW) was mounted in the central part of the vehicle, in the space under the half top deck, providing good weight distribution and high stability. Also offered was the possibility of a petrol version of 145 hp (108 kW). The petrol-fuelled version never got past the prototype stage, due to its high fuel consumption.

The Z-403 was developed and produced in the Pegaso plant in Barcelona, and it is believed that a total of around 50 units were sold. Primary customers were Iberia and Aviaco airlines and Atesa tour operator.

== Film appearance ==
In the final scene of Orson Welles's 1955 film Mr. Arkadin, two Pegaso Z-403 coaches appear prominently close to an aircraft in an airport (actually, Madrid Barajas airport, the coaches belonging to Iberia airlines).

== See also ==
- PD-4501 Scenicruiser

== Bibliography ==
Lage, Manuel. Hispano-Suiza/Pegaso. Madrid 1992. ISBN 84-7782-236-0
