= Pegaso =

Spanish automobile, truck and bus manufacturer

- Industry: Automobile, defense, equipment
- Predecessor: INI
- Founded: 1946
- Defunct: 1994
- Fate: Discontinued; merged into Iveco
- Successor: Iveco
- Headquarters: Barcelona, Spain
- Products: Vehicles, tractors, armored cars
- Parent: Instituto Nacional de Industria

Pegaso (Spanish pronunciation: [peˈɣaso], "Pegasus") was a Spanish manufacturer of trucks, buses, tractors, armored vehicles, and, for a while, to train apprentices, and have a good brand image, some sports cars. The parent company, Enasa, was created in 1946 and based in the old Hispano-Suiza factory, under the direction of the renowned automotive engineer Wifredo Ricart. In 1990, Iveco took over Enasa, and the Pegaso name became a secondary brand of Iveco.

Enasa, a state-owned company, had its main business interest in the truck and bus market. Pegaso became one of the leading European industrial vehicle makers, with significant exports to both Europe and Latin America; the Benelux, Venezuela, and Cuba were its major foreign markets, and a substantial contract to supply tactical trucks to the Egyptian Army was signed in the late 1970s.

The main Enasa factories were located in Barcelona, Madrid, and Valladolid. Between 1946 and 1990, Pegaso built more than 350,000 vehicles; the highest production in a single year, over 26,000, was achieved in 1974.

== 1940s ==
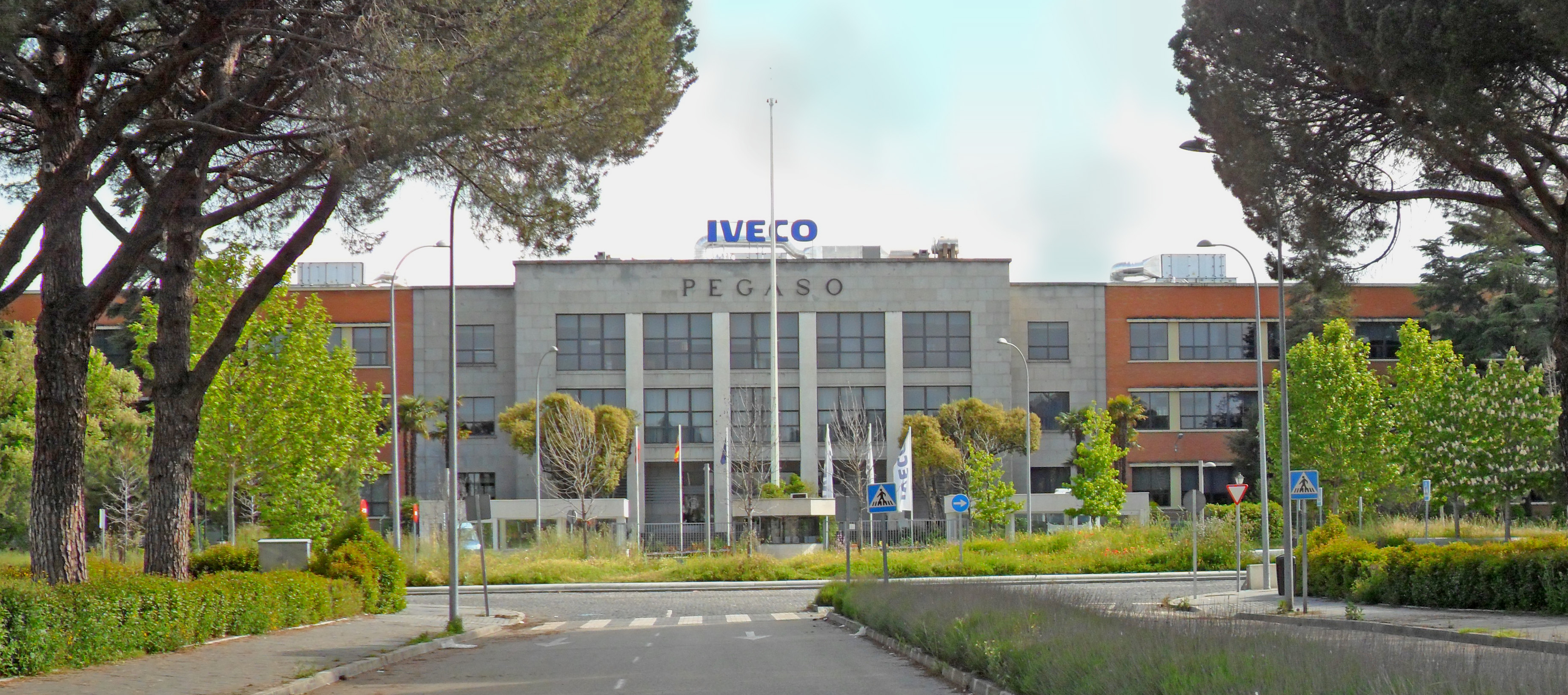
Pegaso factory in Madrid.

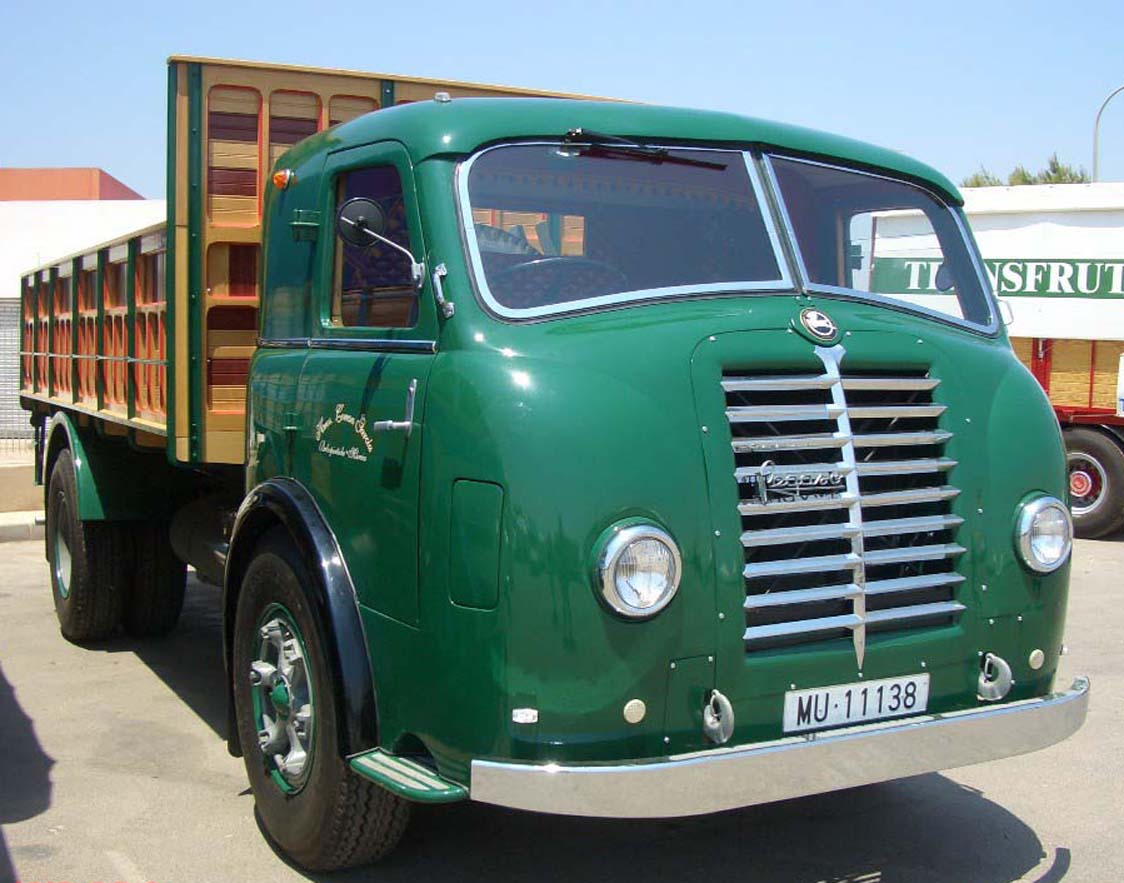
1951 Pegaso II truck as restored in 2006

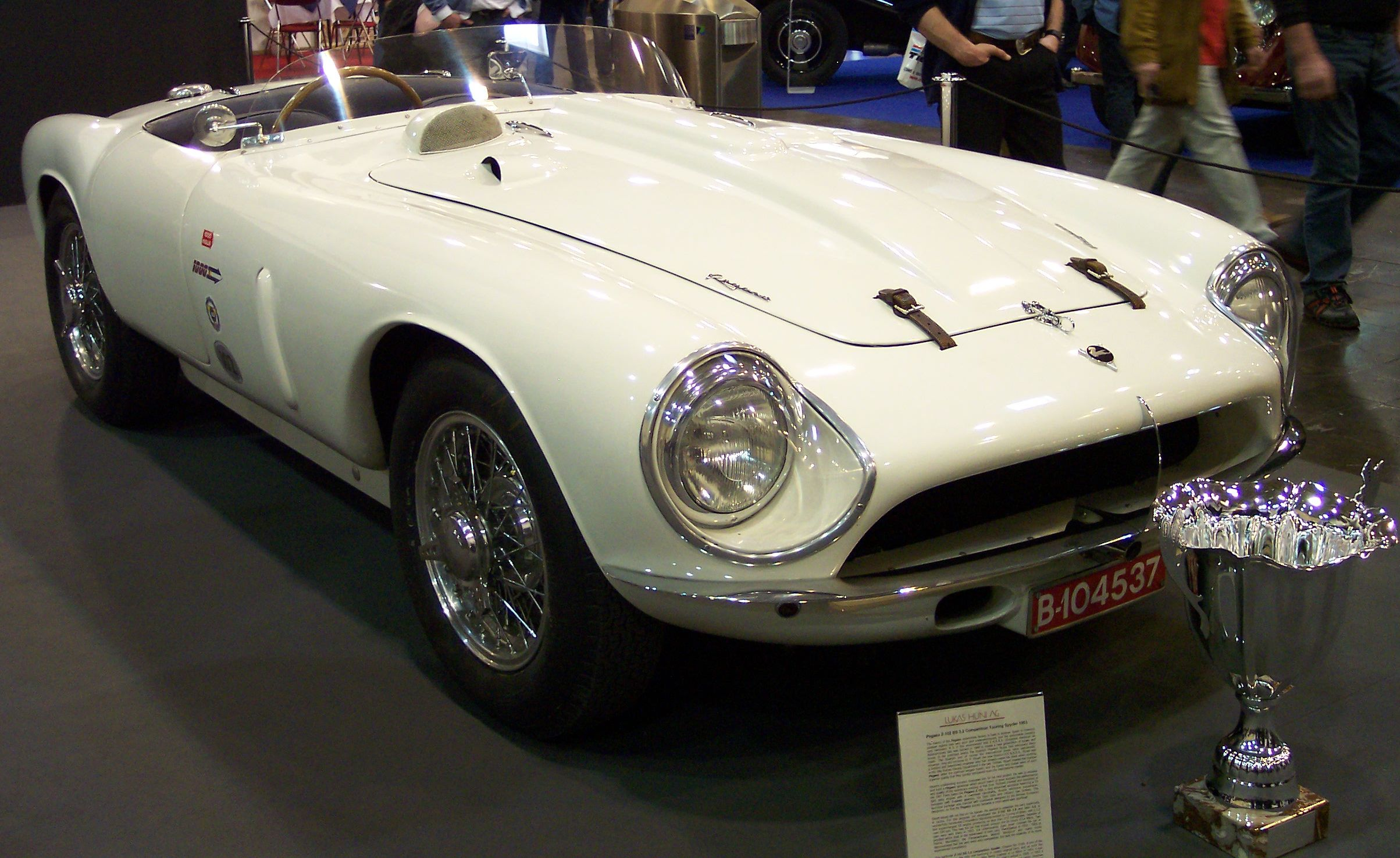
Pegaso Z-102 BS 3.2-litre sports car, Competition Touring Spyder.

The first Enasa produced truck, a slightly modified Hispano-Fiat 66G, was the Pegaso I, of which only a few units were made (due mostly to the severe shortages of the post-war era) in 1946 and 1947. An enhanced but still petrol-engined version, the Pegaso II (model code Z-203), was launched late in 1947 and reached some hundreds of units while awaiting a much-needed diesel model. This was the 125 hp (93 kW) Pegaso Diesel (Z-202), nicknamed Mofletes ("Chubby cheeks") for its bulbous front end, which made its debut in 1949 and quickly established itself as the leader in the still weak Spanish truck market. Artic tractor (Z-701), road train, and coach or 'bus (Z-401) versions soon were also available, and all together they became El camión español ("The Spanish truck"), as Enasa badges and advertisements proudly stated.

== 1950s ==
Pegaso built about a hundred Z-102 sports cars in the 1950s. The cars were, in many ways, advanced for the time, as they had a five-speed rear-mounted transaxle and very powerful all-aluminum DOHC engines. They were offered with the choice of Touring, Saoutchik, Serra, or Enasa's own luxury bodies. The Z-102 was the fastest production car sold in 1953, capable of reaching 155 miles per hour (249 km/h).

In 1954, the old Pegaso Diesel engine was uprated to 140 hp (100 kW) while Ricart's other masterpiece, the Pegaso Z-207 truck, was made ready to enter mass production, into which it was placed from 1955 to 1959. The model Z-207 featured a V6 engine and a corrugated-sheet cab, which was also used in other Pegaso truck models in the 1960s and 1970s. The unusual corrugated design became a characteristic sight of the Spanish landscape in the years following. The Z-702 was the tractor for semi-trailers version of the Z-207, while the corresponding motorcoach, model named Z-407, featuring the V-6 engine located in the rear never passed the prototype stage.

Also technically advanced was the Pegaso Z-403 Monocasco, a two-level monocoque (chassisless) coach with its 125 hp (93 kW) diesel engine mounted amidships, built between 1951 and 1957. In these years, too, Pegaso built the more conventional Z-404 coach or urban 'bus chassis, with a striking body by Seida of Bilbao, and the Z-501 trolleybus, which featured electric equipment by Cenemesa.

In the off-road segment, the first Pegaso product was a caterpillar tractor based on technology from Vender, an Italian specialist, launched in 1957. From then on, Pegaso original crawler tractors, bulldozers and tractors were often badged as EMPRESA locally and these were all produced at their Sagrera factory in Barcelona.

=== Pegaso based mobile cranes ===
Also in the 1950s, ENASA company started to work closely with the three local mobilecrane and truckcrane firms known as IASA, IBESA and LUNA. Eventually all of them needed a large specialist company that could show interest as their business partners. Quickly ENASA was chosen, as it was the longest established manufacturer and they soon built & designed several types of original special cranecarriers and specially built cranechassis most with Pegaso Diesel engines and other parts fitted with necessary modern hydraulics some with 6WD axles others in 8WD form for off-road use and began supplying these 3 Spanish crane specialists with medium to heavy duty 6 wheeled, 8 wheeled and 10 wheeled cranecarriers so that each crane maker would start their own truckcrane and mobilecrane production.

The Huesca-based large LUNA crane company is now the only firm with the largest models available on offer on their range, while the other two only make medium-sized lorry mounted cranes. The now defunct KYNOS-KOEHRING Hispania Crane Group was a short-lived crane company that was the result of a successful joint-venture (1952-1974) founded between the American KOEHRING a large crane specialist and the local Spanish KYNOS a military engineering firm & construction company that together developed and built large mobilecrane and some giant truckcrane models, all were assembled or partially made with numerous Pegaso components and running gear.

== 1960s and 1970s ==
Pegaso 2011/50 tractor for semitrailers truck (ca. 1965)

In the 1960s and 1970s, Pegaso kept pace with the impressive economic development of Spain (the so-called "Spanish miracle"), and tens of thousands of Pegaso trucks and buses ran on Spanish roads and through Spanish cities and, more important, crossed borders in TIR sealed-container traffic to link the Spanish economy with the European Economic Community. The Pegaso flagship of the time was the 2011 tractor for semi-trailers. Pegaso marketed by then a full variety of commercial vehicles; at the top of the line were 8x4 rigids, 6x4 semi-trailer tractors, 6x6 off-road dumpers and military armoured vehicles, a five-axle 10x4 special conversion for the Dutch market, and three-axle articulated buses; all featured Pegaso's own engines of up to 352 horsepower (262 kW).

Production of Pegaso Monotral buses and coaches, based on an Italian Viberti design, began in 1961 and gave rise to a long line of Pegaso chassisless new models during two decades. The first of the series was the successful 6030-N coach, equipped with an underfloor horizontal engine and single-tyre rear axle, making it a very light yet full-length vehicle.

Also in 1961, Pegaso reached an agreement with Vétra, a French trolleybus maker, to launch to the Spanish market a Pegaso trolleybus, called model 8010, based on Vétra technology. The operation, however, was a failure, due to the contemporary import to Spain of several tens of ex-London Transport BUT units; and only one Pegaso 8010, with a Seida body, was ever built.

In 1963, Seida received a license from the German firm Kässbohrer to build Setra chassisless coaches. These were equipped with Pegaso engines and other mechanical units and were marketed with a double badge as the Setra Seida S14 and the Pegaso 5070. Despite being expensive, these coaches were very successful in the Spanish market and competed well with Pegaso's own Monotrals and all other conventional chassis-body models.

This was the main OEM business of Pegaso; others were selling engines for railcars and shunter locomotives and providing running units and cab components to Barazábal, a Vitoria-based maker of special chassis for self-propelled cranes, as the aforementioned IASA, IBESA and LUNA. Specially interesting in the railway OEM sector was the fitting in 1964 of Pegaso engines to five ex-New Haven Railroad Mack railcars operated in Asturias by Ferrocarril de Langreo.

In 1968, Enasa took over S.A.V.A. A year later, the whole Sava range of light vehicles, with roots in designs by the British Motor Corporation, was rebadged as Pegaso.

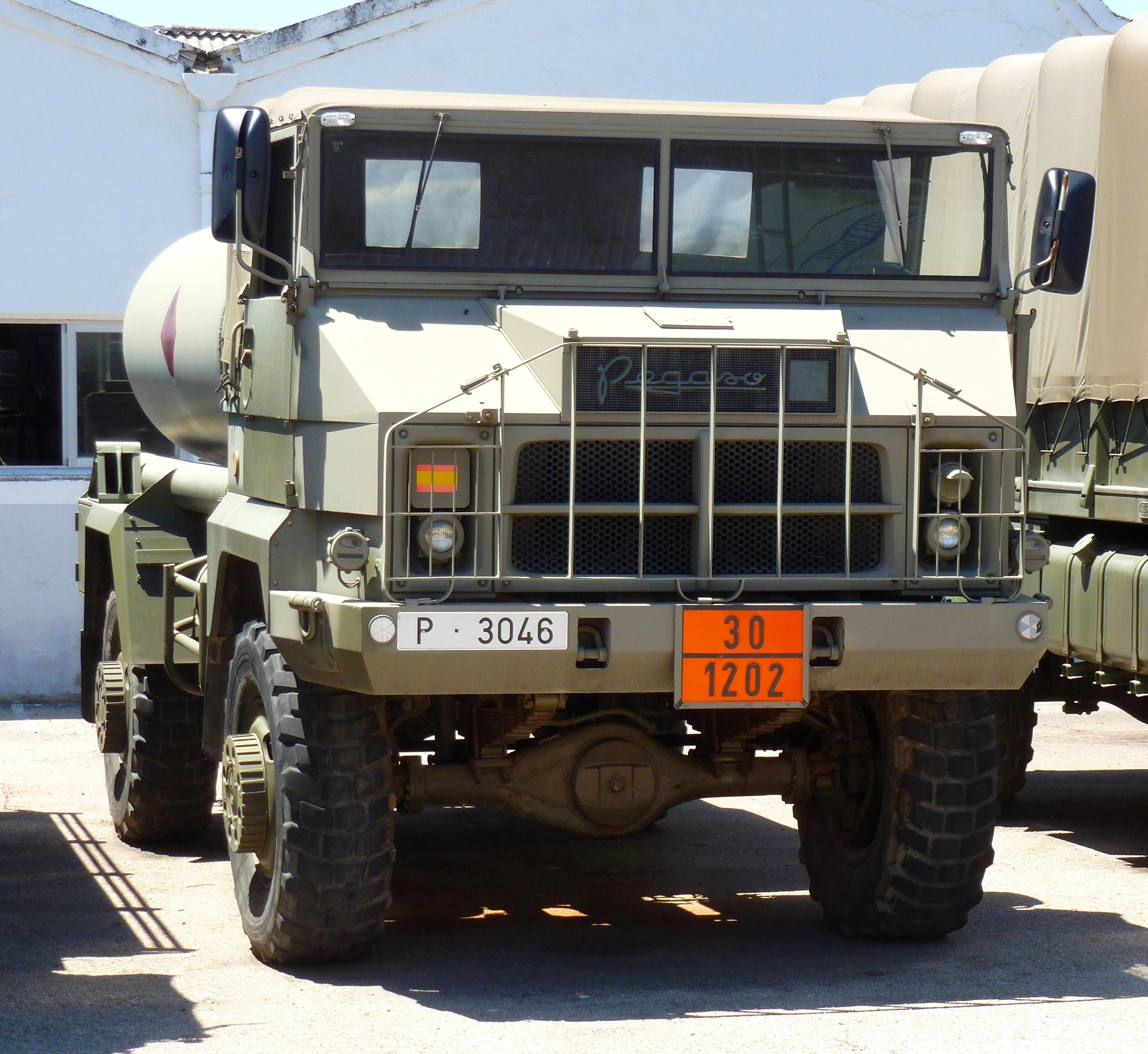
Spanish Army Pegaso 3046 4x4 tank truck

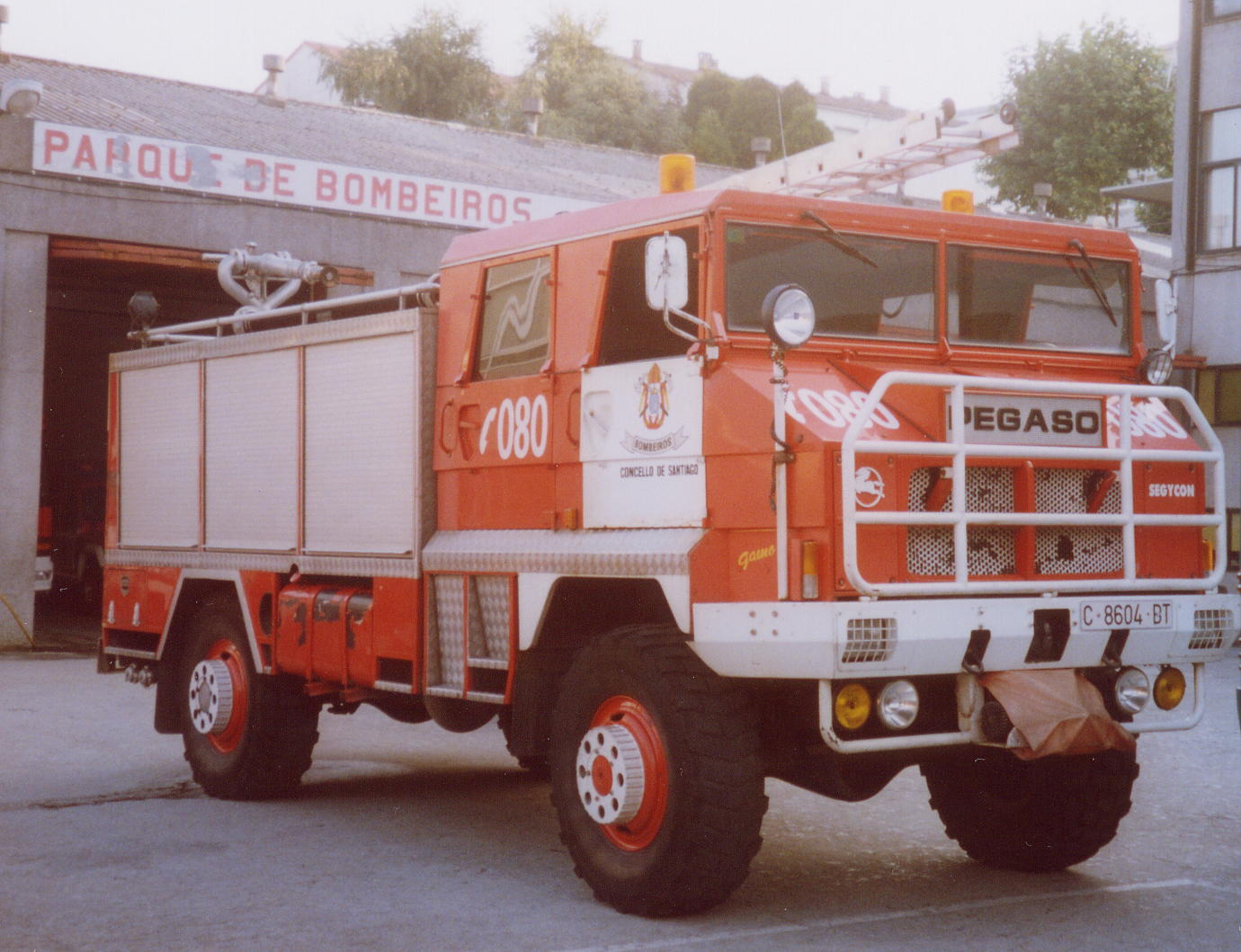
Pegaso 7217 firefighting 4x4 truck

In 1972, a new full range of heavy trucks was launched, featuring a spacious, modernist cubic cab. From then on, the corresponding artic tractors, first the 250 hp (190 kW) 2080 model and later the 310 hp (230 kW) tilt-cab 2181, became the pervasive workhorses on Spanish highways.

On the military side, the first production tactical truck was the 1963 4x4 Pegaso 3020, replaced in 1970 by the 3045 and the 6x6 3050. Subsequent enhanced models, the 170 hp (130 kW) 3046 and the 200 hp (150 kW) 3055, were dominant in the Spanish Army; and the 3046 was also the subject of a substantial contract (up to 10,000 units) with the Egyptian Army. The 3046 was very common in the Spanish forest fire brigades too, where for obvious reasons it was nicknamed Egipcio ("Egyptian").

Related to the all-wheel-drive trucks were four armoured vehicle models launched by Pegaso in the late 1970s: the 4x4 airborne-able 170 hp (130 kW) 3545 BLR, the 4x4 amphibious 170 hp (130 kW) 3550 VAP, the very successful 6x6 306 hp (228 kW) 3560 BMR, and its derivative, the 3562 VEC, all also used in quantity by the Spanish Army.

In 1975, an agreement between Enasa and Allis-Chalmers led to production in Spain of Pegaso-engined Allis loaders and caterpillar tractors, marketed as "Pegaso-Allis". This venture lasted but a few years yet eventually allowed Pegaso to act as dealer for Spain of Italian-made Fiatallis construction equipment.

== 1980s ==
In the 1980s, suffering from the saturation of the European truck market, Enasa sought joint ventures with other truck makers. A failed association in 1978 with International Harvester had resulted in Enasa's taking over the British Seddon Atkinson marque, and a new Enasa subsidiary, Pegaso Agrícola, became the exclusive dealer for Spain of Case IH tractors and agricultural machinery. A similar market agreement with British-based Perkins Engines led to the creation of Pegaso Motor, exclusive dealer for Spain of Perkins marine engines.

Another early original Spanish company called CALSA from Zaragoza specialized in developing and manufacturing off-road tractors and industrial loaders, also used ENASA PEGASO mechanicals and hydraulics for their own heavy duty rugged CALSA original model range. Components were taken by train from the Barajas ENASA factory in Madrid to the Zaragoza Industrial Estate so that specialist CALSA would power their earthmover range of models until they were acquired by another large and independent new owner in 1990.

Later, a joint venture with DAF Trucks produced the cab for the Troner, DAF's new series 95, and the Seddon Atkinson Strato, these trucks being launched in 1987.

In rally racing, Pegaso all-wheel-drive trucks won the 1985 Rallye des Pharaons and the 1986 Paris-Dakar.

== 1990 Iveco takeover ==
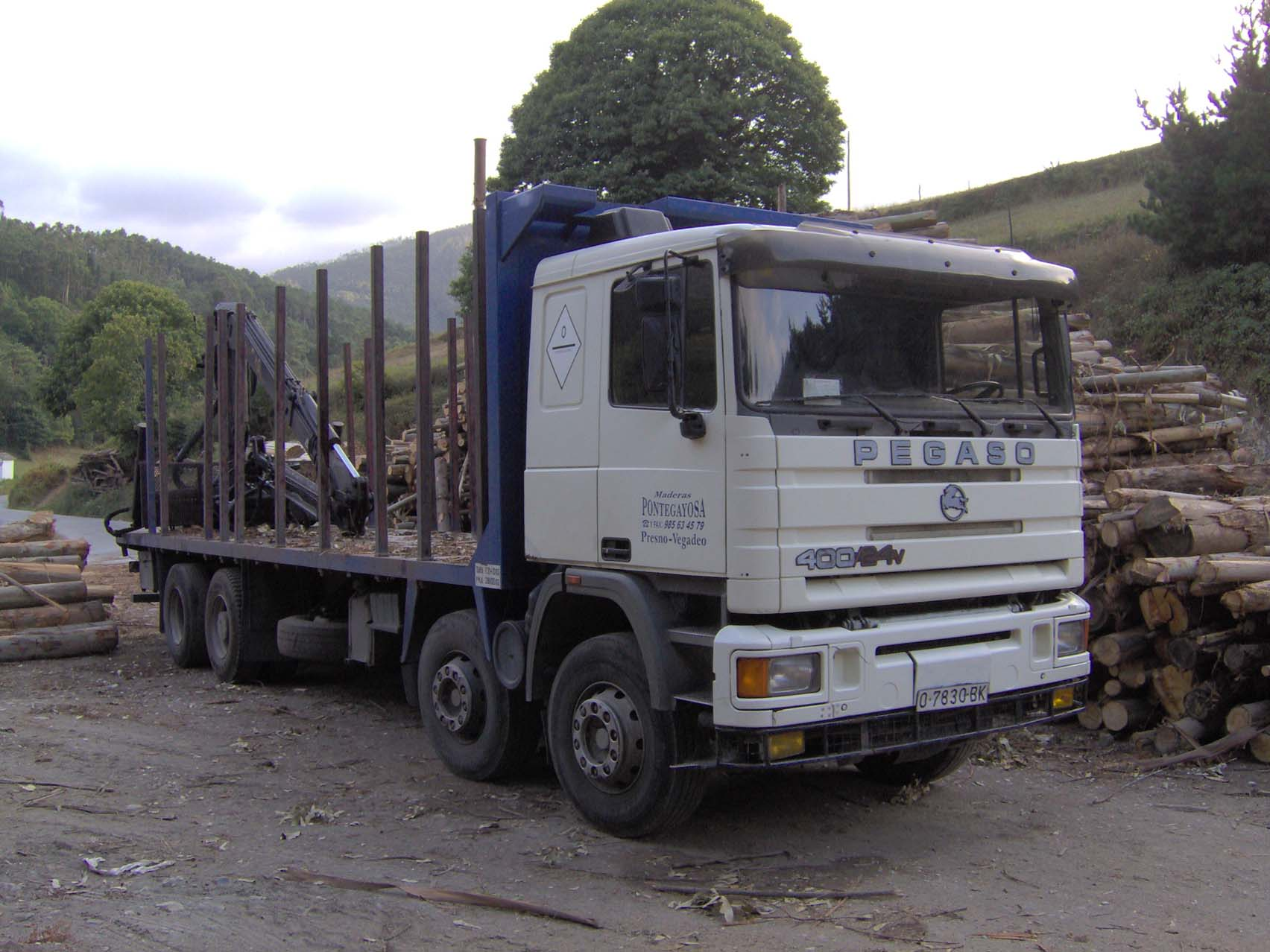
Pegaso Troner logging 8x4 truck (c.2000)

After a joint takeover by Daimler-Benz and MAN aborted at the last hour, Iveco bought Enasa in 1990. At that time, Pegaso offerings included the Ekus (a light truck, actually a rebadging of the Volkswagen LT and MAN-VW G ranges), Mider (medium), Troner (heavy), Trakker (off-road), and Podium (omnibusses and coaches) ranges. A 500 hp (370 kW) futuristic concept truck designed by Francisco Podadera, the Pegaso Solo 500, had been exhibited at the Barcelona Motor Show in 1989.

== Demise ==
Most of the Pegaso ranges disappeared from the market shortly after the Iveco takeover. On July 12, 1994, the last Pegaso Troner left the production line of the factory at Barajas (Madrid); the last Pegaso engine was made in 1995; Iveco has never stopped using the Pegaso brand, using it mainly as a secondary brand.

== List of Products ==
Civilian applications

- Pegaso Z-102
- Pegaso Z-103
- Pegaso Z-207
- Pegaso Z-403
- Pegaso Troner

Military applications

- Pegaso BLR
- Pegaso BMR
- Pegaso VEC
