= Anglada =

Anglada was a Spanish automobile manufactured in Puerto de Santa María in Cádiz, Andalucia from 1902 to 1905. The company named Anglada. Fábrica de bicicletas y automóviles was founded by Francisco Anglada y Gallardo. Anglada made expensive cars by individual order. The cars were either one- or four-cylinder models ranging from 6 to 36 cv. Anglada is notable today, if at all, for producing the first Spanish car purchased by Alfonso XIII; the King bought a 24 hp (18 kW) four from the company in 1904. Although the Spanish aristocrats bought some cars, due to financial problems, Francisco Anglada soon gave up production. He opened an automobile repair shop in Madrid. Francisco Anglada died in 1917.
