= Pegaso Z-207 =

Truck model

The factory-bodied Pegaso Z-207 prototype in the 1955 Barcelona Motor Show

The Pegaso Z-207 was a truck model produced in Spain by Enasa from 1955 to 1959. It featured a V6 engine and a distinctive cab design. It was nicknamed Barajas, for the location, close to Madrid, where a new Pegaso plant was built to produce the Z-207.

The Z-207 was advanced for its time; its 7.5 L V6 engine had an aluminum block with cast iron cylinder liners, balance shaft, and a direct fuel injection system. The engine had two interchangeable cylinder heads, one for each group of three cylinders. It produced initially 110 and later 120 horsepower, enough for the vehicle to reach a top speed of 90 km/h with its maximum weight of 11,320 kg. The engine was mated to a three-speed gearbox divided by a splitter-type system into three low and three high, combined with a two-speed rear axle producing a total of twelve speeds. The splitter control was mechanical, by means of a lever situated under the steering column.

Another characteristic of the Z-207 was the independent front suspension with two superimposed trapezoids with helicoidal springs, each with a corresponding shock absorber offering a greater degree of comfort than a typical industrial vehicle of the era.

The "Barajas" range also included the Z-702, an articulated truck tractor for semi-trailers suitable for a payload of ten tons, and the Z-407, a rear-engined coach that never went into mass production. There was also a four-wheel-drive prototype, coded Z-213.

The Z-207 was expensive to build and to maintain, and was gradually replaced by the more conventional but better-selling Pegaso Comet, which included some Leyland components. Total production of the Z-207 range was 5,737 units.

== Bibliography ==
- Lage, Manuel. Hispano-Suiza/Pegaso. Madrid 1992. ISBN 84-7782-236-0.
