= Pegaso Z-102 =

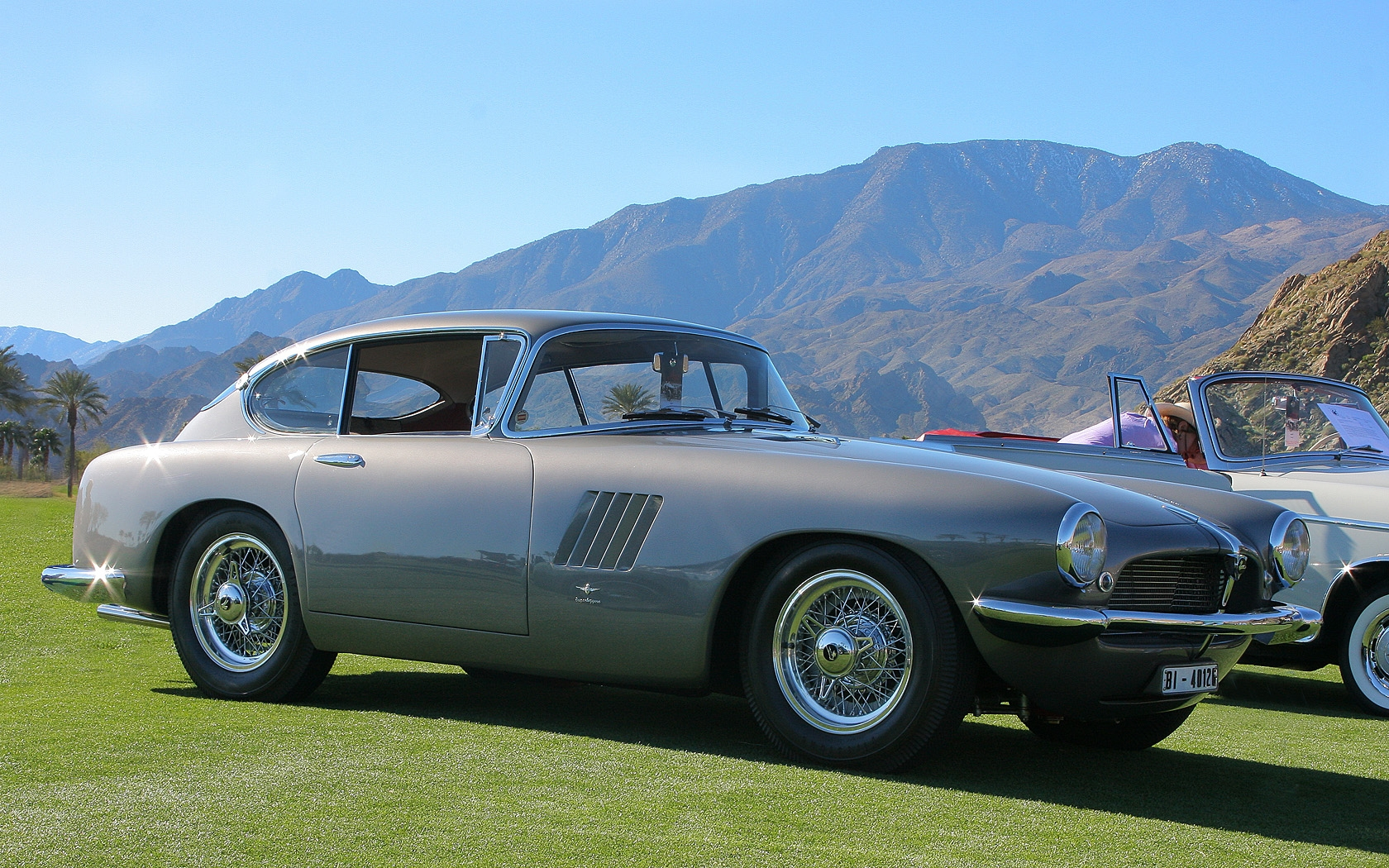
- 1956 Pegaso Z-102 Panoramica Coupe by Touring

Overview
- Manufacturer: Pegaso
- Production: 1951–1958 (84 produced)
- Designer: Wifredo Ricart (original design); Carrozzeria Touring, Saoutchik, Enasa, Serra (coachbuilt variants)

Body and chassis
- Body style: 2-door coupe 2-door convertible
- Layout: FR layout

Chronology
- Successor: Pegaso Z-103

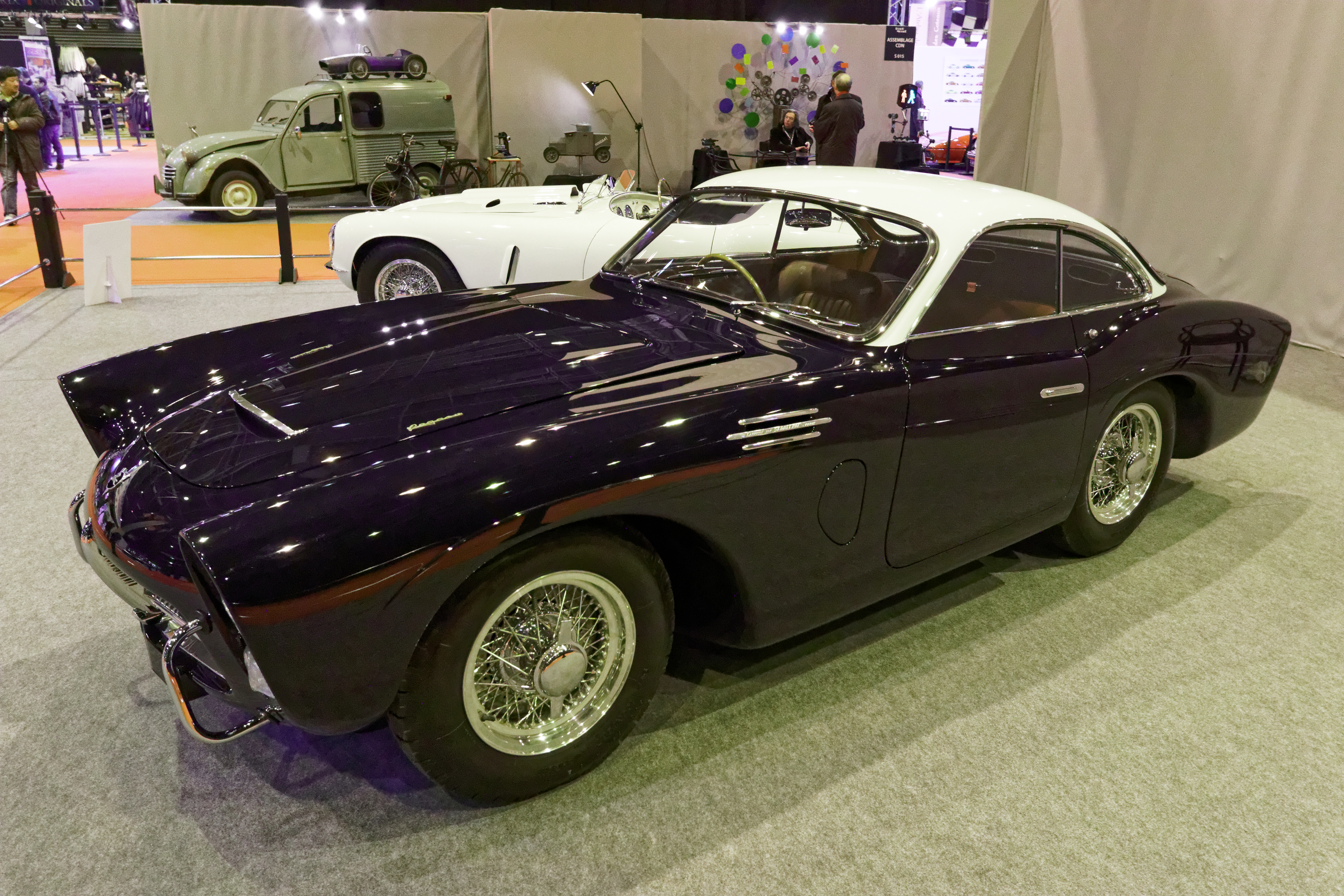
1954 Pegaso Z-102 coupe bodied by Saoutchik.

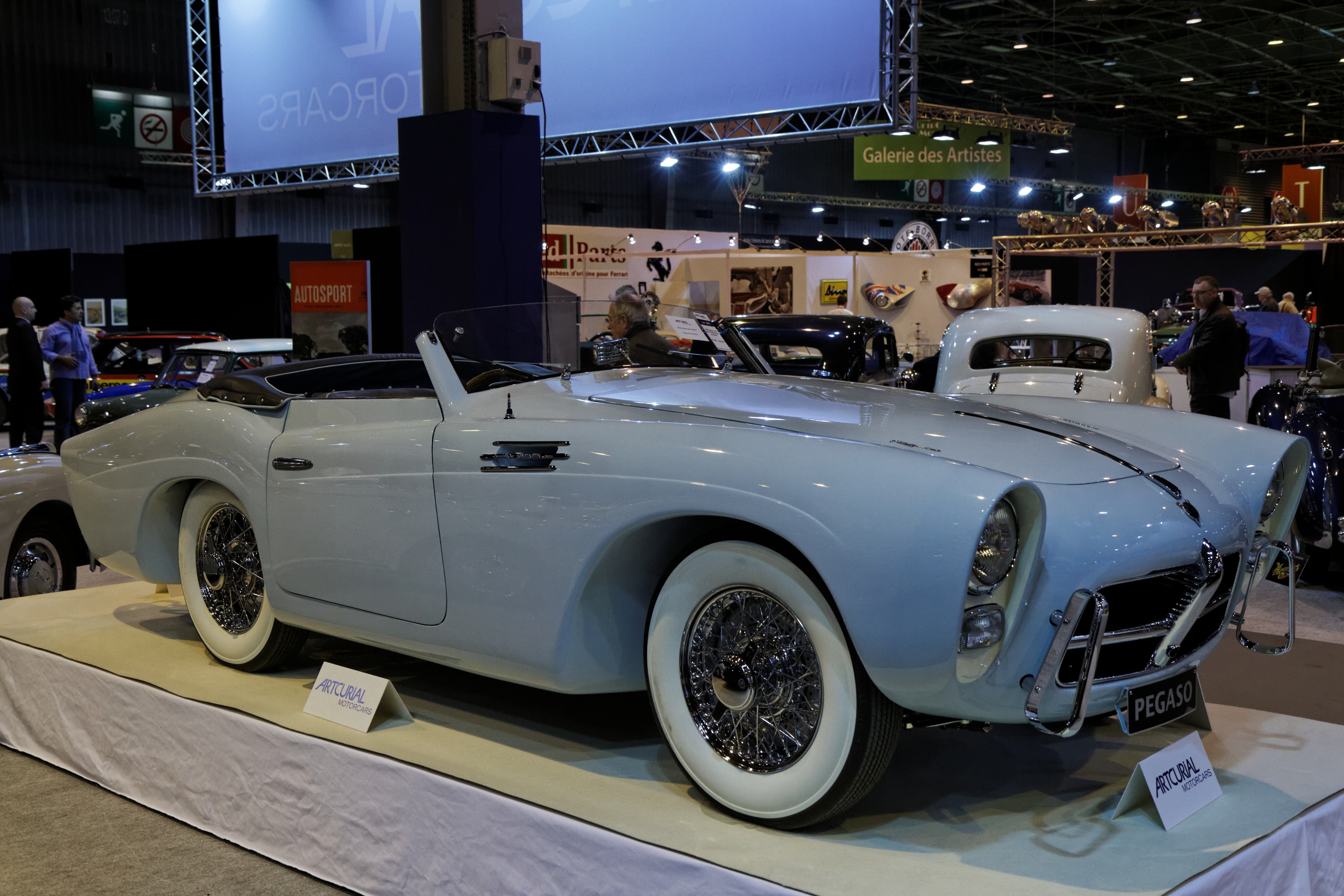
1954 Pegaso Z-102 Series II Cabriolet by Saoutchik

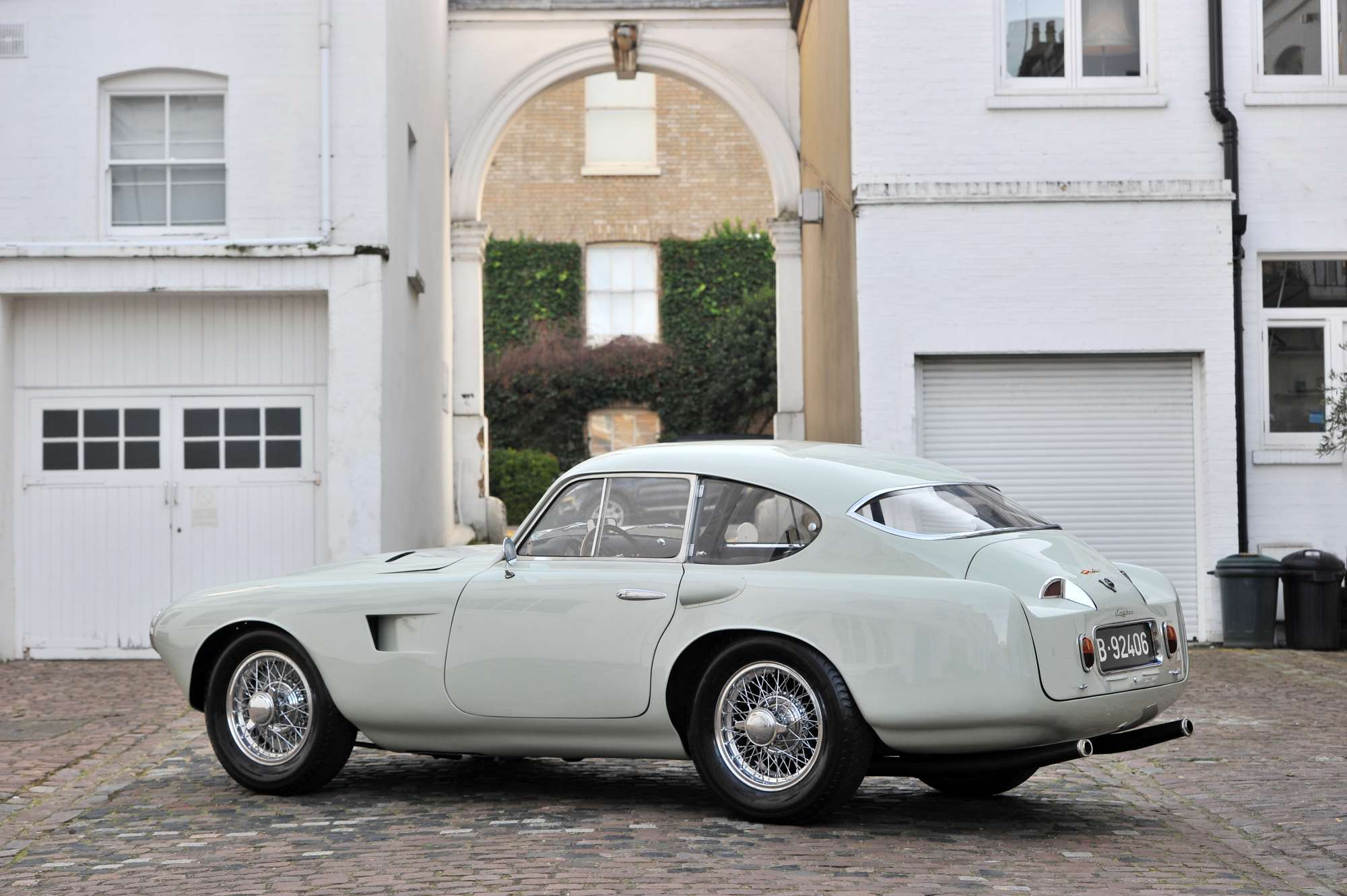
Pegaso Z-102 Berlinetta by Touring rear 3/4 view

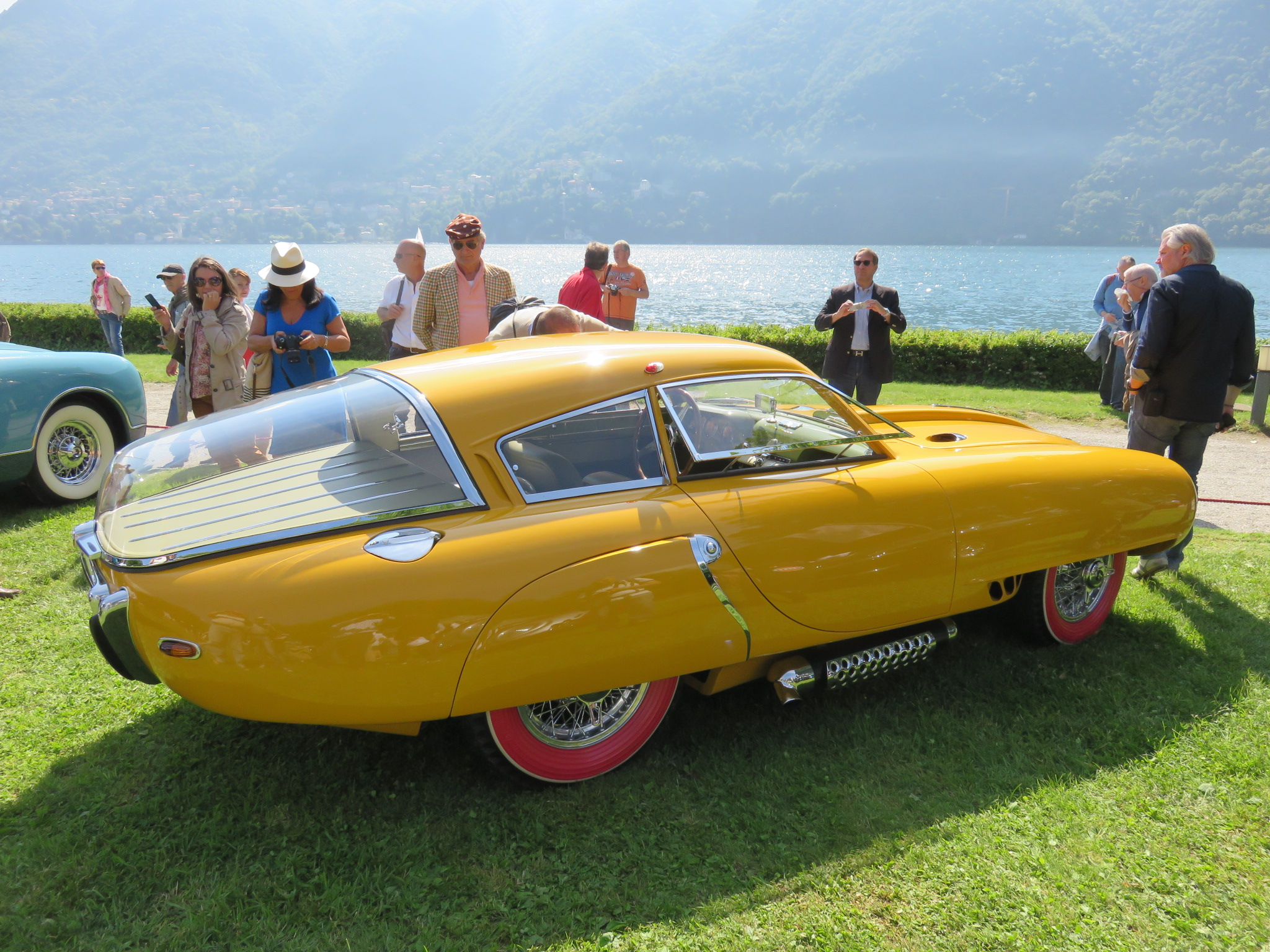
1952 Pegaso Z-102 Cupola rear 3/4 view

The Pegaso Z-102 is a Spanish sports car produced by Pegaso in Spain in both coupé and cabriolet form from 1951 until 1958. The Z-102 was one of the fastest cars in the world at the time of production, having reached a top speed of 151 mph (243 km/h).

== Background ==
Pegaso was an established company noted for its trucks and motor coaches, but also produced sports cars for seven years. Pegaso's chief technical manager was Wifredo Ricart who formerly worked as chief engineer for Alfa Romeo, and while there designed the Alfa Romeo Tipo 512. The Z-102 started life as a pair of prototypes in 1951 with coupe and drophead body styles. Both prototypes had steel bodies which were determined to be too heavy and Pegaso made the decision to switch to alloy bodies to reduce weight. However, the cars were still quite heavy and brutish to drive and racing success was virtually nonexistent. Because the cars were built on a cost-no-object basis the car soon proved too costly to warrant continued production and the Z-102 was discontinued after 1958. A simplified and cheaper version, the Z-103 with 3.9, 4.5 and 4.7 litre engines, was put into production but had little success and only 3 were built.

== Production ==
Pegaso made the Z-102 starting in 1951 and finishing in 1958, having built a total of 84 cars (some sources say only 71). Out of those 84, 28 were cabriolets while the rest were fixed-roof coupés. The original design for the Z-102 was penned by Pegaso chief technical manager and automotive engineer Wifredo Ricart, formerly chief engineer for Alfa Romeo. 19 cars were bodied by Pegaso's parent company Enasa, 11 of which were Berlinettas. The majority of Z-102s had bodies by Carrozzeria Touring (although early Z-102 units carry Pegaso-made bodies), but a handful of cars had bodies by other coachbuilders. Carrozzeria Touring's design built on Ricart's original design, with changes including redesigning the grille, lowering the car, re-positioning the fog lights and simplifying various details to give it a cleaner profile. This body style is the most well known and numerous of the Z-102 bodies. French coachbuilder Saoutchik bodied 18 cars, 3 of which were convertibles, as well as one of the original prototypes. Coachbuilder Serra bodied a handful of cars as well. Enasa also built a version of the Z-102 called the "Cupola" which was designed based on sketches from Spanish students. The students were given the challenge of sketching what they thought cars of the future would look like. Prominent design cues from those drawings were then taken, and Enasa brought the car to life. Only two "Cupola" models were known to have been built. One of the two was purchased by Dominican dictator Rafael Trujillo. Only one of the Cupola models is known to have survived and it is currently owned by the Louwman Museum.

== Specifications ==
The Z-102 had a pressed steel chassis with an alloy body. Everything was produced in-house at Barcelona at Pegaso's own factory, with the exception of coachwork.

The Z102 entered production with a four-cam all-alloy 2.5 (2,472 cc) litre V8 engine featuring dry-sump lubrication, as was used in the prototypes, though later variants used a 2.8 L (2,816 cc), and 3.2 L (3,178 cc) litre DOHC desmodromic 32-valve V8 360 hp (268 kW) engines with multiple carburetors or an optional supercharger. The standard 2.5 L engine used chain-driven camshafts, dual distributors and had a maximum engine speed of 6000 rpm. Another version of this engine was also offered, intended for cars with the lightweight bodywork, and for competition use, which featured gear-driven camshafts, Bosch magneto ignition, and a maximum engine speed of 6800 rpm. Power ranged from 175 hp (130 kW) to 360 hp (268 kW) and was sent to the rear wheels through a five-speed non-synchromesh transaxle gearbox. The base model Z-102 had a top speed of 120 mph (192 km/h). In supercharged trim, the Z-102 could reach a top speed of 151 mph (243 km/h), making it one of the world's fastest production car at that time.

The main beams of the car's frame had large lightening holes, and the wheel wells under the body were used as stressed members.

This rear-wheel-drive car had its transmission in the rear, connected to the differential (making it a transaxle). But it was unusually located behind the differential within a reverse A-frame whose apex was at the rear of the chassis. A fuel tank was situated on each side of the transmission.

The rear suspension was De Dion, with the unusual feature that to restrain the tube from side-to-side movement, its tube had a small wheel at its midpoint that rolled in a vertical channel on the front of the differential (which in a De Dion system is bolted to the chassis) instead of using a Watt's linkage or a Panhard rod.

== Racing ==
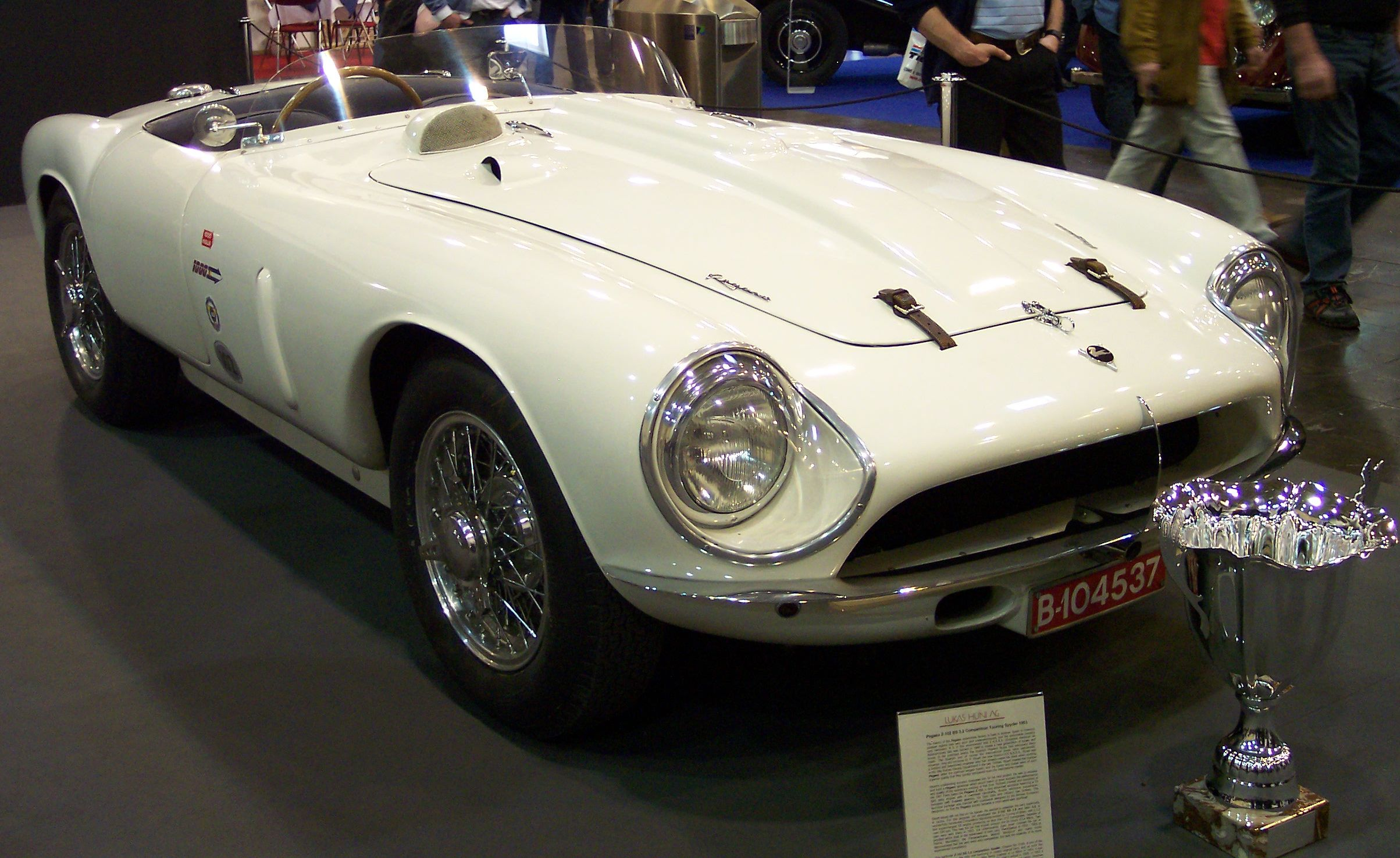
Pegaso Z-102 BS 3.2 Competition Spyder by Touring

ENASA registered two Pegaso Z-102s in the 1952 Monaco Grand Prix, which was exceptionally held for sports racing cars. Chassis 0113 and 0115 were registered for Juan Jover (number 52) and Joaquin Palacios (number 54) respectively, plus a third reserve car. Three Z-102s were entered by Pegaso in the 1953 24 Hours of Le Mans (some sources claim the number was 4, and others claim only 2 entered), but during the race driver Juan Jover misjudged the speed of his approach to the corner after the Dunlop bridge, causing him to crash his Z-102 Spyder into the barriers at more than 200 km/h (120 mph). He sustained serious injuries to his left leg from the crash, and Pegaso decided to withdraw their other cars. They competed also in the 1954 Carrera Panamericana, driven by Joaquin Palacio, achieving promising results in the first stages, but an accident prevented an excellent final position.

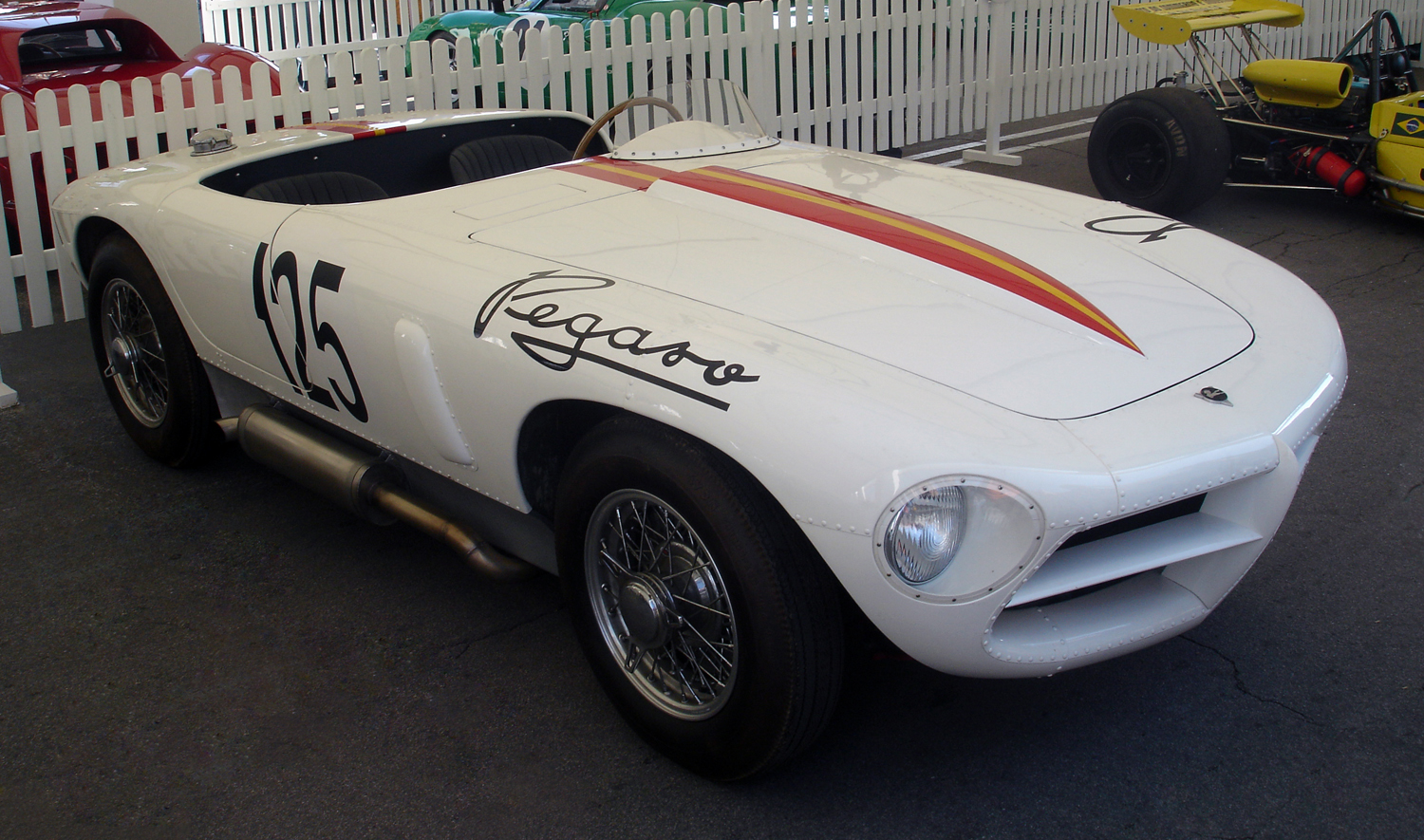
Pegaso Z-102 Spider Rabasada, 1953.

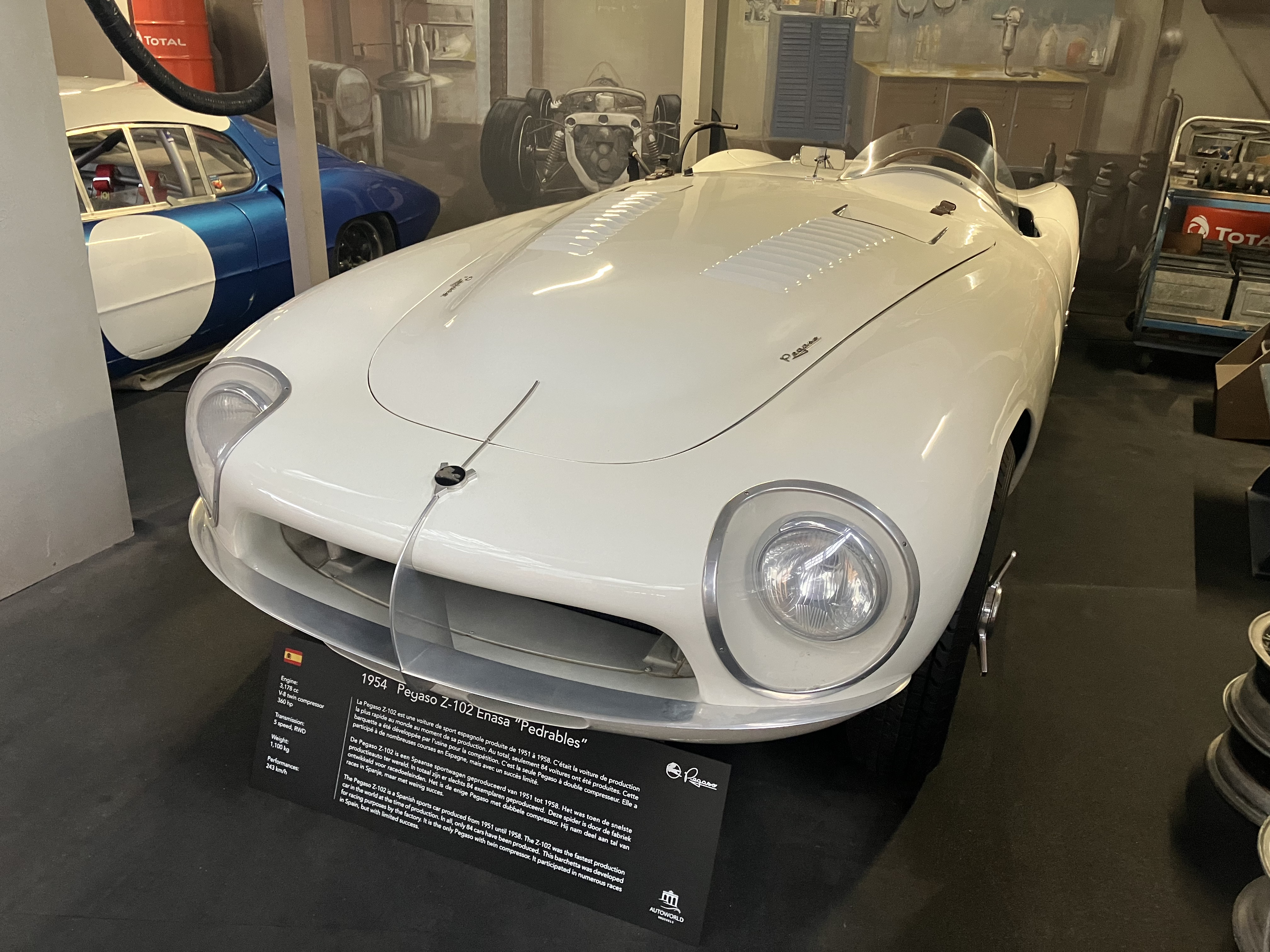
1954 Pegaso Z-102 Enasa "Pedralbes"

On September 25, 1953, in Jabbeke (Belgium), a Z-102 Touring BS/2.8 (the old Barchetta used at Le Mans, 2.8 litre single supercharger), driven by Celso Fernández, broke four official R.A.C.B. (Royal Automobile Club de Belgique) world records. Of these records the most prominent was its speed in the flying-start kilometer. The supercharged Z-102 achieved a 243.079 km/h (151.042 mph) average, a record previously held by a Jaguar XK120. This made the Z-102 the fastest production car in the world at that time. The original Z-102 BSS/2.5 Bisiluro Especial Competición (2.5 litre twin supercharged) built to take on the records couldn't be used because of a blown engine.

== Concours events ==
A Pegaso Z-102 coupé with coachwork by Saoutchik, owned by Baron Thyssen-Bornemisza, wearing leopard skin upholstered seats and gold controls won the 1953 Enghien-les-Bains (France) Grand Prix d'Elegance. A 1952 Z-102 "Cupola", one of two believed to have been made and the only one known to have survived, took the Chairman's Choice Award and Best of Show Concours de Sport at the 2016 Amelia Island Concours d'Elegance. At the 2023 Pebble Beach Concours d'Elegance, Pegaso was included as a featured class, featuring nine of the best examples in the world.

== Technical data ==
Note: Technical data is for the 2.8-liter Z102 produced in 1953.

Pegaso	Z-102
Engine:	Front-mounted, longitudinal V8 engine with alloy block and cylinder heads
Bore x Stroke:	80 mm x 70 mm
Displacement:	2816 cc
Max power @ rpm:	170 CV (168 hp; 125 kW) (at least) @ 6300 rpm
Max torque @ rpm:	22 kg⋅m (159 lb⋅ft; 216 N⋅m) @ 3600 rpm
Compression ratio:	8.8 : 1
Fuel feed:	4 Weber 36 DCF3 carburetors
Valvetrain:	DOHC
Cooling:	water
Gearbox:	5 speed manual rear wheel drive, axle ratio: 4,18:1 to 5,2:1
Front suspension:	Multi-link suspension, torsion bar
Rear suspension:	De Dion axle
Brakes:	drum brakes
Steering:	rack and pinion
Body structure:	aluminium/steel on multitubular frame
Weight:	990 kg (2,183 lb)
Track front/rear:	1320 mm / 1290 mm
Wheelbase:	2340 mm
Length:	4100 mm
Top speed:	225 km/h (140 mph)
0–100 km/h (0–62 mph) acceleration:	8.5 seconds
Fuel consumption (estimate):	13.2 to 14.5 liters/100 km

== Gallery ==
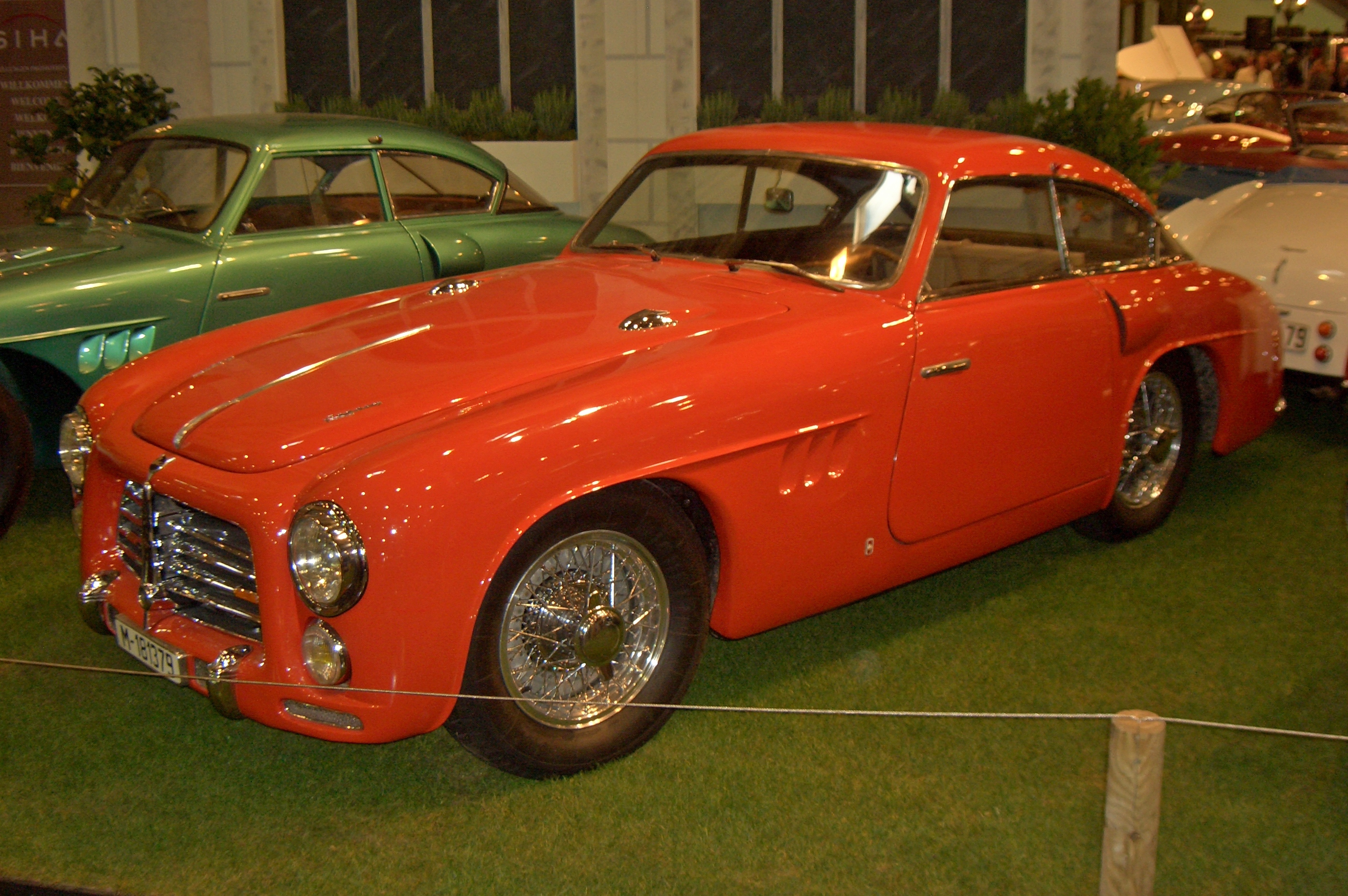
An early Z-102 Berlinetta with coachwork designed in house and built by Enasa, Pegaso's parent company

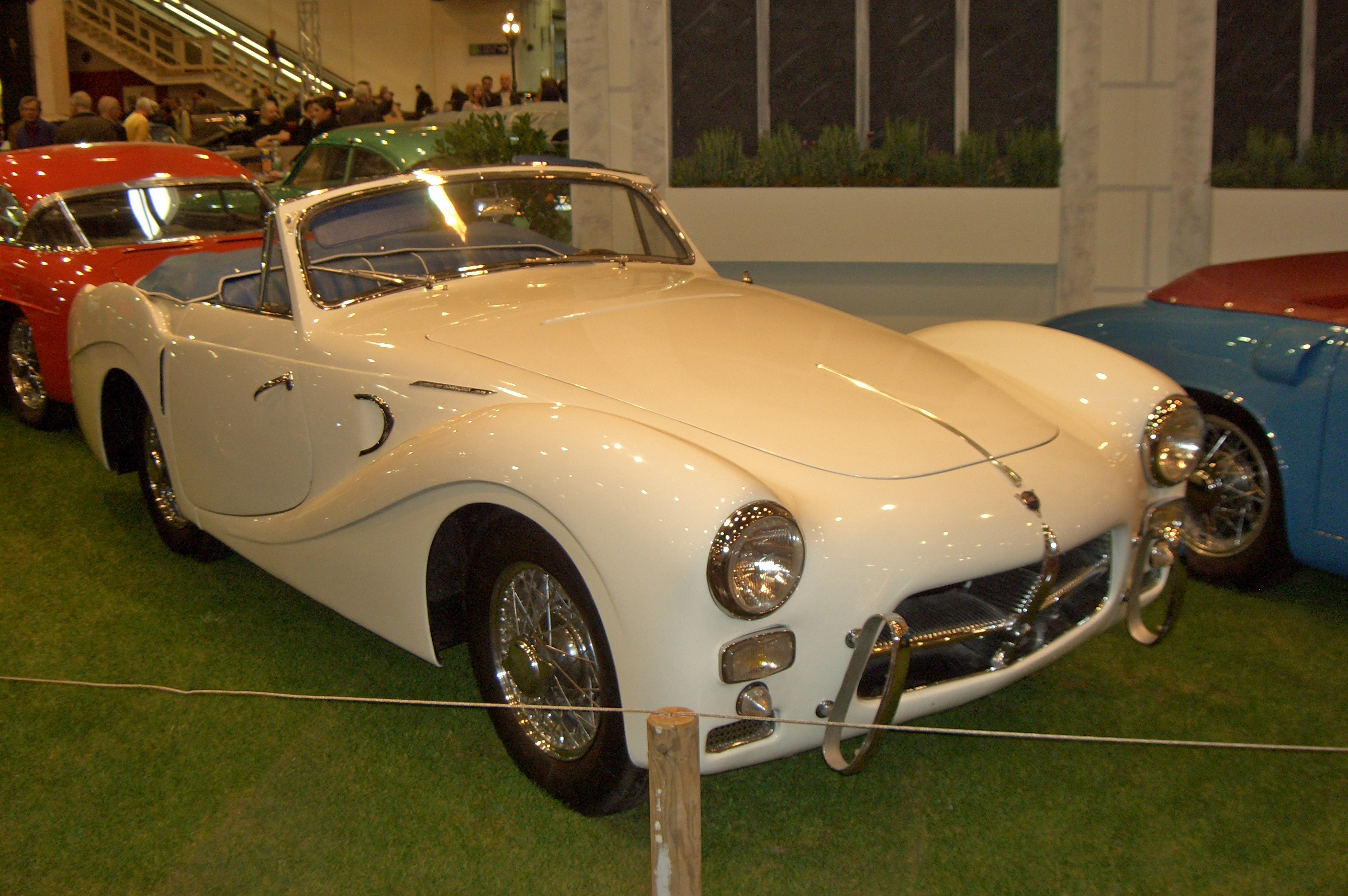
An early Z-102 Spyder with Saoutchik coachwork

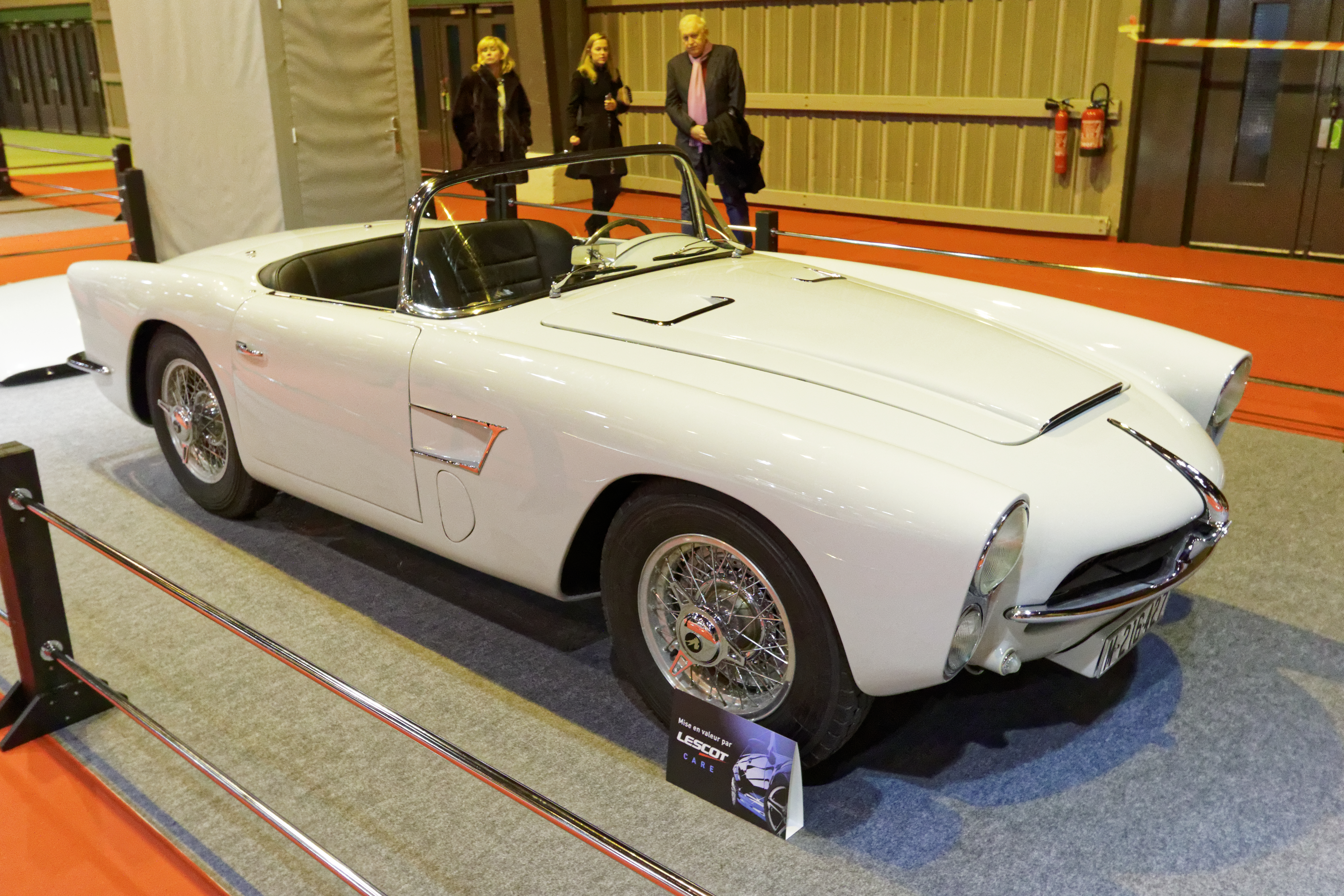
1953 Pegaso Z-102 Spider by Serra

== See also ==
- Production car speed record
- Timeline of most powerful production cars

Preceded by Jaguar XK120	Fastest street-legal production car 244.62 km/h (151.99 mph)	Succeeded by Mercedes-Benz 300SL
