= El Fénix (automobile) =

Spanish automobile brand

The El Fenix was a Spanish automobile manufactured from 1901 until 1904.

A product of Barcelona, it was built by Domingo Tamaro Roig (1878–1959), a pilot in the Barcelona merchant navy. In 1898, he contributed to the creation of the first specialized publication on the subject, "El Automovilismo Ilustrado." Támaro served as editor, writer, and illustrator before eventually becoming the director. In 1899, he began working at La Cuadra, and when the company closed in 1901, he decided to establish his own business, initially focusing on electric accumulators and later on cars. he built a few twin-cylinders with gas engines under this name before joining Turcat-Méry in 1904.

After founding his company, Automóviles Fénix, Támaro created an extensive distribution network, but there is no evidence that he ever manufactured any vehicles. However, he did build an engine, which was featured in the French magazine "La Locomotion Automobile" in early 1903. Despite advertising in various specialized publications throughout the year, Automóviles Fénix suddenly disappeared when, in early 1904, Támaro accepted an offer from the Marseille automobile company Turcat-Méry to work there in an important position, which he took on in 1905.
