= Seddon Atkinson =

Company

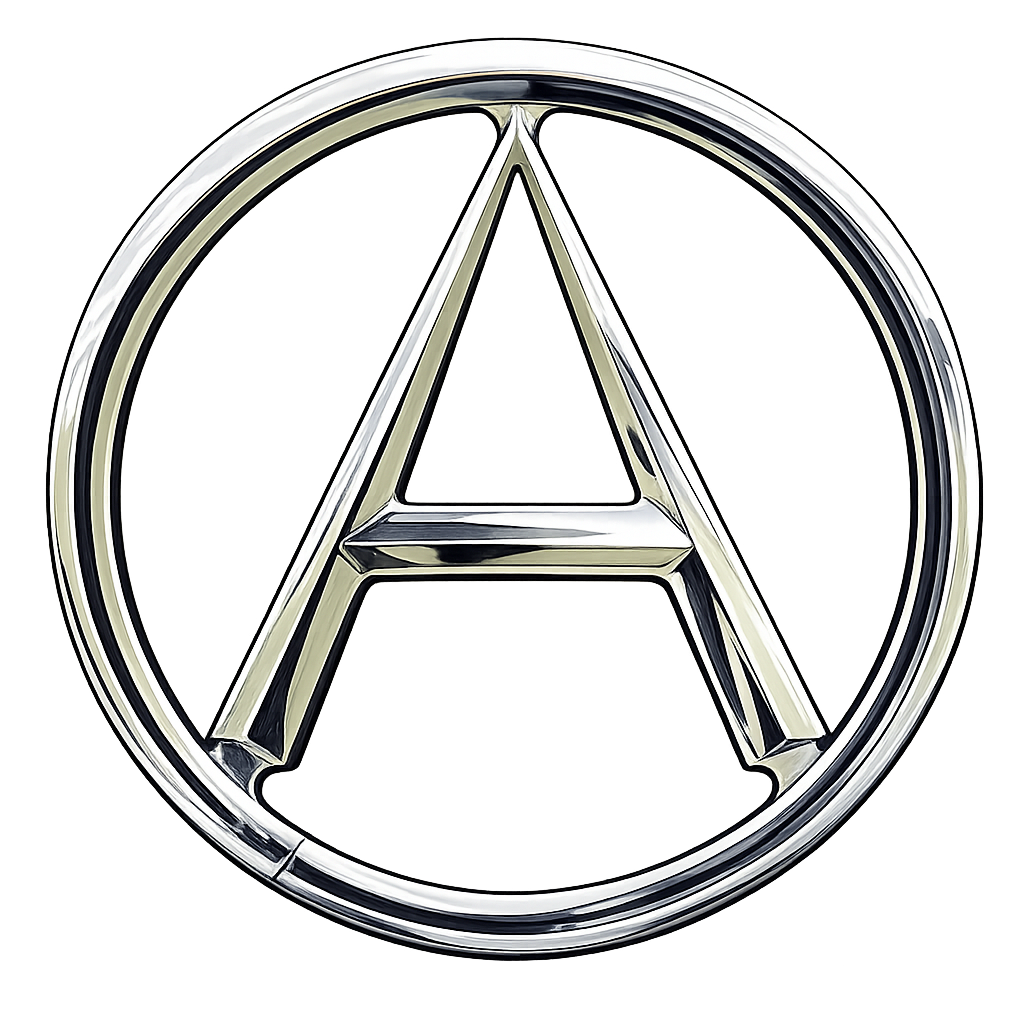
- Industry: Automotive
- Predecessor: Atkinson Vehicles; Seddon Diesel Vehicles
- Founded: 1970
- Defunct: 2009
- Headquarters: Oldham, England
- Products: Buses; Trucks
- Parent: Iveco

Seddon Atkinson Vehicles Limited was a manufacturer of large goods vehicles based in Oldham, England, was formed after the acquisition in 1970 of Atkinson Vehicles Limited of Preston by Seddon Diesel Vehicles Limited of Oldham. In 1974, the firm was acquired by International Harvester, which sold it in March 1984 to Enasa which made it a subsidiary of Pegaso. In 1990, it became part of Iveco which used the brand for various types of specialised vehicles in the United Kingdom. The range of models produced included EuroMover, Pacer and Strato, which are aimed at refuse collection, recycling and construction operators.

Iveco announced its decision to manufacture Seddon Atkinsons in Spain in 2005, and shortly afterwards the brand name was incorporated into the mainstream Iveco catalogue. The Oldham manufacturing facilities were shut down in 2004, and the offices were closed at the end of 2006.

Recent Seddon Atkinson vehicles were readily identifiable from other Iveco products because of the company's former Atkinson logo, a large letter 'A' within a circle, usually in chrome (or chrome-effect) on the radiator grille. The circular Atkinson logo dated from 1937, supplemented by the 'Knight Of The Road' badge between the early 1950s and late 1970.

== Atkinson ==
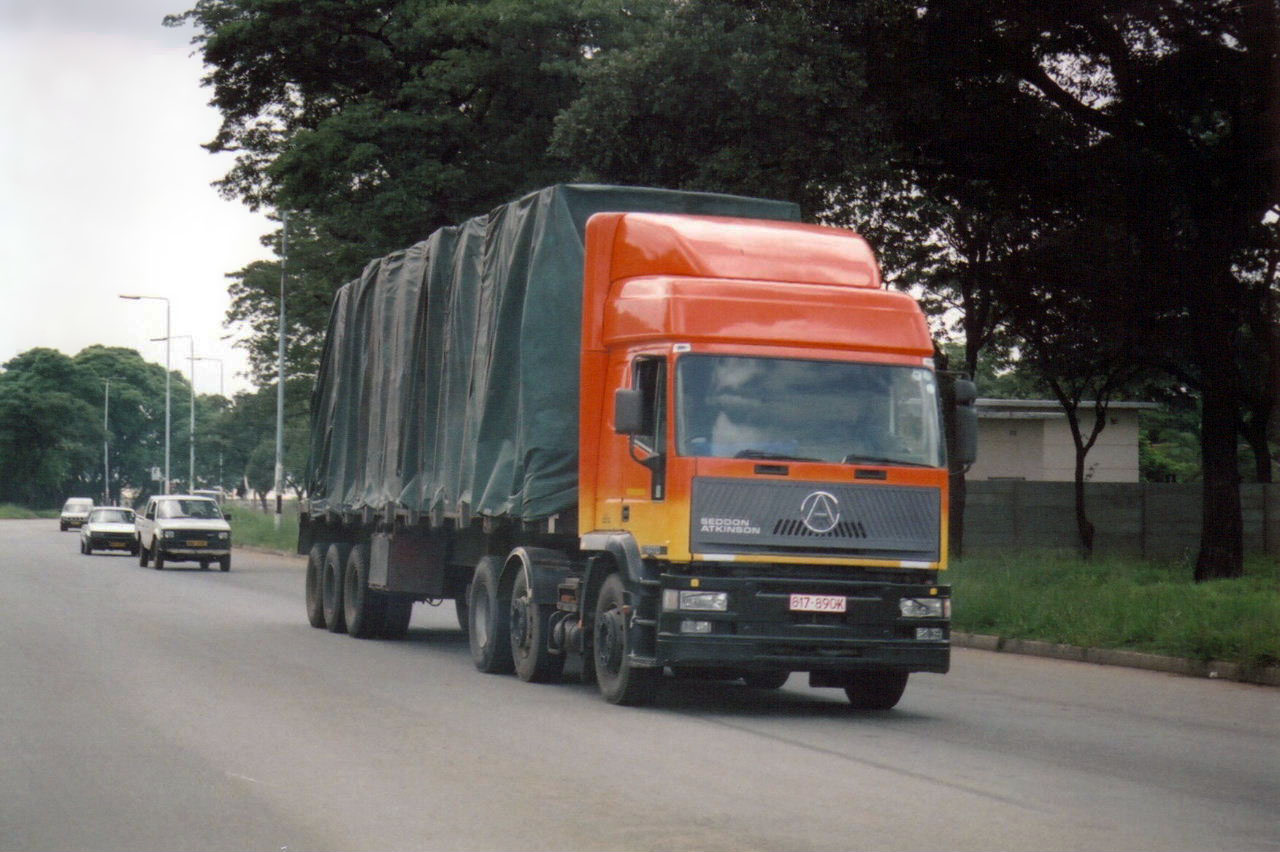
Seddon Atkinson Strato truck in Harare, Zimbabwe

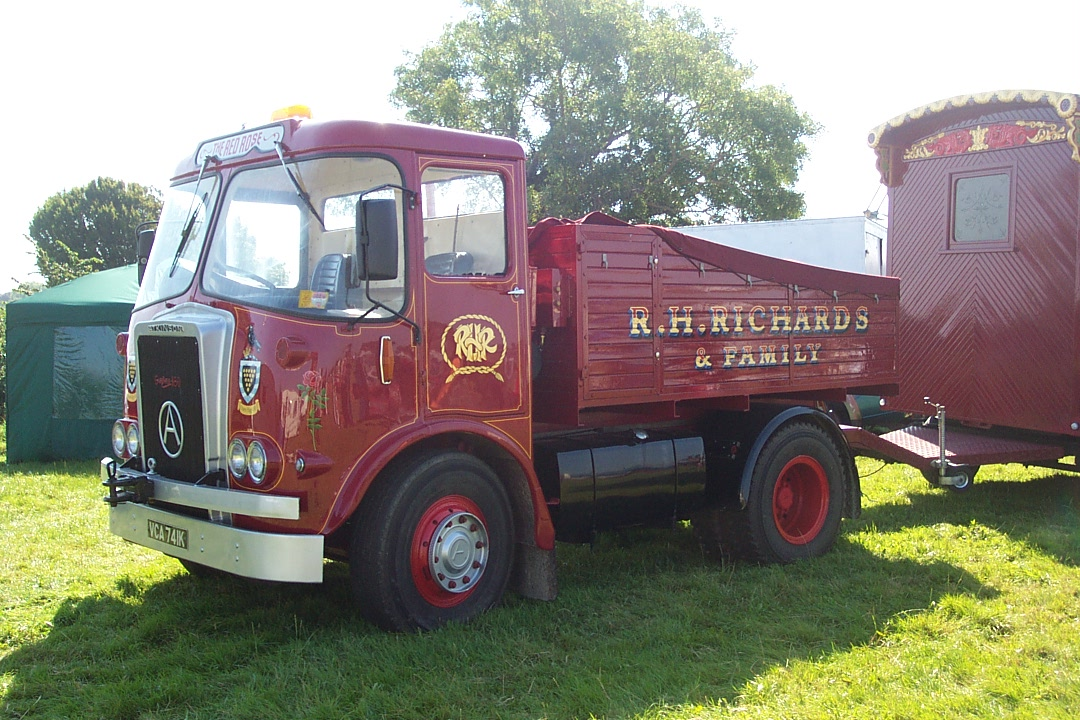
Preserved Atkinson ballast tractor in August 2007

Originally a firm of steam-wagon repairers and manufacturers, founded in 1907 in Preston, Lancashire, Atkinson & Co. evolved into Seddon Atkinson Vehicles Ltd through a succession of mergers.

=== Early years ===
Atkinson & Co. was founded in the Frenchwood district of Preston, the cotton town and administrative capital of Lancashire, by two of five brothers, Edward Atkinson (1880–1932) and Henry Birch Atkinson (1882–1921) with assistance from their brother-in-law George Hunt (1870–1950). The real and effective beginning of the company was in 1907, when the partners decided to capitalise on the need for local engineers to make temporary or permanent repairs to the increasing number of 'pullcars' and private motor vehicles on the road. By 1912, the organisation had moved to premises in Kendal Street and the number of employees had grown to 20. In the same year a second, smaller repair centre was opened in Freemason's Row, Liverpool, to cater for the enormous volume of steam traffic using the docks. Very soon the company made something of a name for itself in the north of England as quality repairers, and the growing number of operators brought new business from far and wide.

=== Progress ===
With the outbreak of World War I in 1914, demand for internal road transport grew considerably, the nation finding itself desperately throttled by the inadequacy of the railways to offer a complete transport network. Some method of local delivery and collection was needed to supplement the services of the railway companies, and with most of the existing steam wagon manufacturers turning their resources over to munitions production, demand increased further. The Atkinsons, shrewd observers at any time, decided to experiment by making a wagon of their own design, and in 1916, the first Atkinson six-ton four-wheel steam wagon was produced in Kendal Street and became an instant success. The market enjoyed a short boom period following the Armistice and the Atkinsons, realising the potential, purchased a five-acre site of land near their homes in Frenchwood, on which they intended to erect a new and enlarged factory, solely designed for the production of steam wagons. Together with the field they also bought the 17th century Frenchwood House, with the intention of using it partly as their offices and partly as their personal quarters. By 1918 the Atkinsons had built up a competent team of engineers and salesmen as well as an enthusiastic and loyal labour force, and were producing wagons competitive in both price and performance. Henry Atkinson died suddenly in 1921 and consequently the company fell into the hands of his brother Edward. At this time, new ideas and designs were constantly being tried out while production rose to a peak of some three wagons per week, and the total labour force rose to well over 150.

=== Decline of steam ===
Edward Atkinson had a glorified view of steam and did not acknowledge the warnings when sales began to slow down in the mid-1920s. Leyland Motors sold their steam remnants to Atkinson in 1926, followed by Mann in 1929. There seems to have been various family rivalries at the time and the firm was undoubtedly in difficulties when Edward Atkinson decided to seek help from mine engineers and Pagefield lorry makers, Walker Brothers of Wigan. Under a new arrangement, Walkers manufactured Uniflow engines for Atkinsons, but by this time very few orders were forthcoming. Edward Atkinson had cancer and was unable to pay any dividends on the preference shares and finally abandoned wagon production in 1929 after a grand total of about 545 Atkinsons had been built. The final years were made possible by a cancellation fee from Manchester Co-op Society, which had ordered a hundred wagons. The Frenchwood and Freemason's Row factories closed with the end of the steamers, though the Kendal Street factory remained for repairing and servicing existing wagons. Edward Atkinson died in 1932 and a year later the firm he co-founded was acquired by London garage owner W. G. Allen, whose father had started Nightingale Garage. Allen was chairman of Atkinson Lorries (1933) Ltd and H. B. Fielding was managing director. Allen had effectively run the firm since 1931, and remained in charge until his death in 1949.

=== Atkinson lorries ===
The formula established in the 1933 reorganisation served the company well and became the basis of most production at Walton-le-Dale (the new factory opened in 1948) thereafter. The production philosophy was similar to that of Seddon, ERF, Rutland (Motor Traction) and other competitors aiming for value-for-money lorry sales, viz: the assembly of tried and tested proprietary components. A bought-in chassis frame to Atkinson design was generally powered by a Gardner engine, driving through a David Brown gearbox to Kirkstall Forge Engineering rear axles. During World War II, Gardner engines were reserved for military applications, excepting the Guy Arab bus; Atkinson lorries sanctioned by the Ministry of Production for sale to civilian hauliers for the duration were fitted with the AEC 7.7 litre unit (which actually displaced 7.58 litres). Nationalisation of the road haulage industry in 1948 affected Atkinson as many of their customers were private sector general hauliers who were nationalised, but British Road Services bought rigid-eight Atkinson Lorries alongside similar products made by state-owned Bristol Commercial Vehicles.

During the 1950s hauliers began to ask for more powerful engines – at the time, Gardner only offered engines for road-vehicle applications with a maximum output of 120 bhp. In response, in the early 1950s Atkinson trial-fitted a Daimler 650 cubic inch engine rated at 150 bhp in a rigid-eight (8-wheel, non-articulated) chassis. Later, Rolls-Royce and Cummins engines were offered alongside Gardner units; Gardner responded with a 150 bhp unit in 1957, and 180 and 240 bhp units in 1966 and 1970, respectively.

In 1958, following a change in Construction & Use Regulations, Atkinson offered a glass-fibre clad cab (which became known as the Mk I cab) as a replacement for the previous coachbuilt hardwood and metal cab on standard production models; it featured twin fixed wrap-around windscreens rather than the traditional flat opening glasses but retained the traditional exposed Withnell-tube type radiator. The initial offering was a single headlight model, followed in 1963 by the 'Deluxe' twin headlight model which quickly became an Atkinson characteristic. As orders for the twin headlight model increased, the single headlight version was dropped as an option. From the 1950s many Atkinsons had carried the 'Knight of the Road' trademark device on the upper offside corner of the radiator grille, and in the 1960s models were sold under the trade names Silver Knight (tractor unit), Gold Knight (rigid tipper or tanker) and Black Knight (rigid freight chassis), as well as the 'Weightmaster' range of lightweight chassis.

A small number of left-hand-drive Atkinsons were built for export to mainland Europe in the late 1960s, with pressed-steel cabs bought from Krupp after that company had ceased commercial vehicle production. Most were sold eventually in the U.K., via Comberhill Commercials of Wakefield. A different design of glass-fibre cab, launched in prototype form at the 1966 Commercial Motor Show, and named View-Line, had a deep single-piece main windscreen with wrap-around quarter glasses. The prototype had three separate chrome radiator grilles, but lacked the character of the exposed radiator models. Thereafter, although the Krupp Cabs, introduced in 1969, and View-Line cabs had concealed radiators, they carried a fibreglass replica of the Atkinson radiator outline with the 'Big A' device centred upon it. Both were available until 1970 but ceased prior to both the launch of the new model range in October 1970, and the merger with Seddon.

Notable Atkinsons of the era were a fleet of 6x6 gritters built in 1962–73 on the orders of various U.K. highway authorities for use on the motorway network. These had Cummins NH engines installed, rather than the more popular Gardner power units, due ostensibly to the use of steel in their construction, which didn't suffer salt corrosion to the same degree as the alloy-constructed Gardners. Early examples had AEC engines.

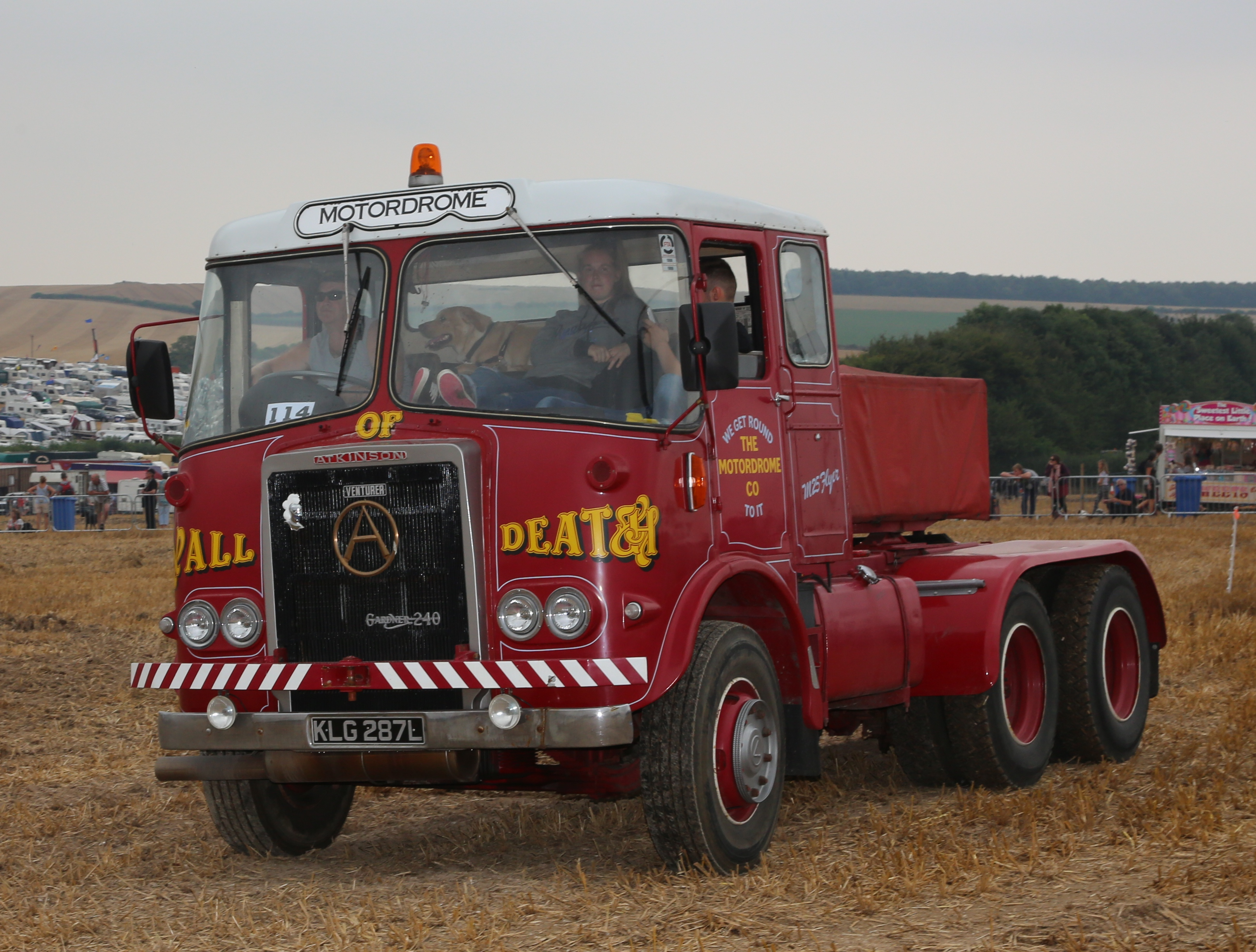
A 1972 Atkinson Leader - modified to appear similar to a 6x4 Venturer

From 1968 the standard Mk I glass-fibre clad cab was revised, with stronger ash framing, larger dimensions and wider, deeper windscreens. The traditional Withnell-tubed, exposed radiator was replaced with the more imposing concealed version, which was fitted behind a glass-fibre shrouded metal grille - again carrying the Knight's Head, circular A logo and additional adornments in the form of engine manufacturer plates.

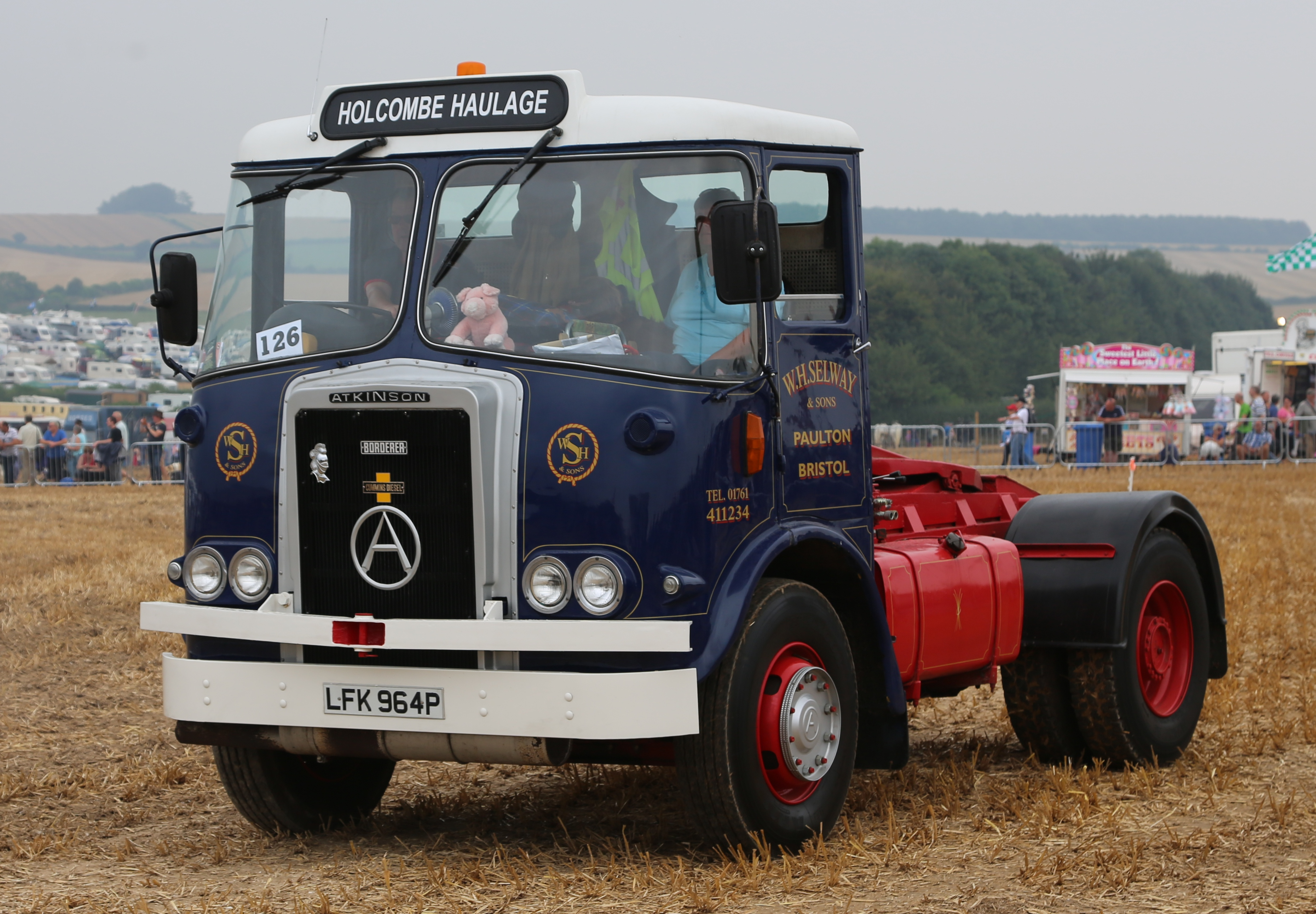
A 1975 Atkinson Borderer

This cab featured on the final Atkinson haulage models, announced at the Commercial Motor Show at Earls Court in October 1970, the naming of which originated from an idea by Frank Whalley, the company publicity officer at the time. The most famous of the range were two-axle tractor units carrying the name 'Borderer'. Three-axle rear-steer tractor units carried the name 'Leader', and were designed to meet eagerly anticipated increases in permitted gross weights (although no increases were actually forthcoming until May 1983). Three-axle haulage chassis carried the name 'Searcher'. Four-axle chassis carried the name 'Defender'. Three-axle heavy haulage tractor units carried the name 'Venturer'. The two-axle haulage chassis were never given an official name, but were originally planned to carry the name 'Raider'; however factory grille plates were never produced for this model, and company literature never referred to the proposed name.

It was at this time that the famous 'Knight of the Road' badging was dropped. When the exhibits were being prepared for the Commercial Motor Show at Earls Court in October 1970, they were fitted with four separate badges on the radiator grille: the 'Big A', the Knight's head, the new model name and the engine manufacturer's badge. The late Frank Whalley recounted that, when Managing Director Peter M Yates saw them, he said that they looked "like fairground lorries" and directed Frank to terminate the use of the Knight badge forthwith. This was also consistent with ending the use of the 'Knight' names for the model range.

There is one vehicle which assumed a name of its very own after it was modified by one of its owners - John Killingbeck. The vehicle in question is MVD432L, which was originally a T3446C 'Borderer' and survives in preservation. After acquisition by Killingbeck, it was stretched into a 6x2 'Chinese Six' tractor and fitted with an uprated Gardner 6LXB engine to enable it to meet the legal requirement for 6 bhp/ton after 1973, whereupon the well-known Atkinson enthusiast and archivist, Michael Deuchars, named it 'Buccaneer'. A replica grille plate was made in a similar fashion to those on factory vehicles and was saved by an enthusiast prior to the closure of the company.

=== Australia ===
In 1965 Atkinson opened a production facility in Australia, at Clayton, Victoria. This factory produced similar models to those in the UK until 1977 when the new owners, International Harvester, decided to move production to its existing plant in nearby Dandenong and concentrate on a new model, the F4870 which was a premium customisable vehicle based on their successful T-Line series. This turned out not to be as successful as hoped, possibly due to its price differential from the more basic T-Line. It did, however, remain in limited production until 1989.

=== Bus production ===
In 1948 Bristol Commercial Vehicles had been nationalised as part of the Tilling Group. Thanks to a Conservative-sponsored amendment to the Transport Act 1947 (designed to make sure British Railways' locomotive and rolling stock works did not compete with the private-sector) Bristol found itself legally unable to accept orders for its bus chassis outside fleets wholly owned by the British Transport Commission, a situation which lasted until 1965.

One of the most loyal Bristol customers up to 1948 had been the North Western Road Car Company of Stockport, who had until 1941 been jointly owned by Tilling and British Electric Traction (BET), after 1941 it was transferred to BET control. After the North Western's last Bristols were delivered in 1950, the company took Leyland Titans and Royal Tigers for a year or so, but the heavy weight, high fuel consumption, poor braking performance and high purchase cost of the Royal Tiger led North Western's management to seek an equivalent to the nationalised sector's Bristol LS bus, with lightweight construction and a Gardner engine horizontally oriented and mounted underfloor. Not impressed by the heavyweight Gardner-engined Guy Arab and Daimler Freeline they approached Atkinson asking for a bus to their specification. This was called the Atkinson Alpha, the first entering service in August 1951. The Alpha range featured a horizontal Gardner engine (four, five and six-cylinder versions were offered), a choice of constant mesh and synchromesh gearboxes from David Brown, and either a lightweight or medium-weight frame. As events turned out, after the initial two batches for North Western in 1953/54 – the first of which were rare rear-entrance underfloor-engined buses – the senior management of the BET group removed Atkinson, Guy and Daimler from their list of preferred suppliers. Around the same time, Leyland dropped the purchase price of the Tiger Cub. North Western then took Tiger Cubs and AEC Reliances for their single-deck needs for the rest of the 1950s.

Atkinson's management then decided that although Daimler and Guy were publicly offering Gardner-engined double-deckers, and some influential (mainly Scottish) customers could purchase AEC Regents with that make of engine, they would also enter this market. Thus at the 1954 Earls' Court Commercial Motor Show two Atkinson double-deck buses were exhibited: one was a chassis, the other carried a 60-seat centre-entrance double-deck body by Northern Counties to the order of the Stalybridge, Hyde, Mossley and Dukinfield Joint Transport (and Electricity) Board. This bus (UMA370) is preserved by the Museum of Transport, Greater Manchester and is also of interest as the first double-deck bus with an electrically controlled direct-acting epicyclic gearbox, this Self-Changing Gears (SCG) unit was fitted by Atkinson after delivery but before entry into service as the SHMD board's drivers (who were used to pre-selective transmissions on the fleets' standard Daimlers) did not want to use the originally installed David Brown constant-mesh unit. The un-bodied exhibition chassis, which featured semi-automatic transmission, was dismantled around the same time. No further Atkinson double-deck bus chassis were built.

It is unclear whether Atkinson's early lead in two-pedal bus transmissions has anything to do with the minority shareholding (around 15%) that Leyland Motors held in Atkinson Lorries (1933) Ltd until the firm was taken over by Seddon. Leyland were, by 1954, part owners of SCG but the 1954 PDR1 prototype had the direct air-operated Pneumocyclic transmission at the time. Neither Guy nor Daimler had a two-pedal transmission and AEC had only just exhibited theirs on the prototype AEC Routemaster.

As well as an underfloor engined single-deck and a front-engined double-deck, Atkinson also produced a front-engined single-deck bus chassis, this being to a similar layout to the Bedford SB but of more durable construction. It sold well to Atkinson export markets, mainly in the Sterling zone, and an example survives as a mobile home in New Zealand. In the United Kingdom sales of this Atkinson bus amounted to three: one batch of two for a municipal operator and a further frustrated export chassis.

Norman Morton, the General Manager of Sunderland Corporation Transport from 1953 to 1968, looked for efficiency-savings wherever they could be found. He had a route with a peak vehicle requirement of two, and a peak load of just over 40 which was being run by a pair of 32-seat 1950 Guy Arab III half-cab single deckers due for overhaul. Initially he approached Guy with the replacement specification, but they said they were not prepared to build a mere two buses to his detailed requirements, so he went to Atkinson. Sunderland 30-1 (GGR230-1) were the result, bodied in 1958 by Charles H Roe to FB41F layout and 8 ft wide by 30 ft long box-dimensions; they had constant-mesh gearboxes and four-cylinder 80 bhp Gardner 4LW engines. The route was a 'limited-stop' taking workmen from their homes to the docks and back again. The route was not hilly and the stops were few. The bodywork was utilitarian and the livery was mainly drab mid-green with cream window surrounds. The 41 seats were well-shaped and well padded and the wide double-stream entrance-exit just aft of the front wheels was covered by four-leaf double jack-knife doors.

Shortly afterwards a frustrated export chassis, to a shorter wheelbase and 27 ft 6in overall length, was bodied by Plaxton to its then-new Highway outline at the orders of a Wakefield dealer, Comberhill Motors who registered it as NHL127 and sold it to Simpson of Rosehearty.

After North Western were discouraged by the British Electric Traction group from purchasing Atkinson Alphas the company sought sales in the independent market, producing lightweight bus and coach demonstrators. A large independent which did buy some was Lancashire United Transport and SHMD bought some Alphas to go with their double-decker. The most successful fruit of Atkinson's bus-sales effort was with Venture Transport (Newcastle) Limited, of Consett, County Durham. Between 1946 and 1948 Venture had replaced the majority of its pre-war fleet with 35-seat Willowbrook-bodied Daimler CVD6's. No further buses were bought by Venture over the next half decade. In 1954 Atkinson lent Venture TTC882, a HV Burlingham bodied 44-seat bus which met with the approval of Venture's management and orders ensued for twenty-four vehicles delivered in three batches from 1955 to 1957 with differently styled B45F or DP41F Willowbrook bodies. Over the rest of the 1950s small numbers of Alphas were sold to other independent operators.

The Alpha continued to be listed without sales into the 1960s but a final home market order came from Sunderland Corporation in 1962 for 1963/64 delivery. The three buses concerned looked like buses from a different age to previous Atkinsons as they carried Marshall bodies of 33 ft length and 8 ft 2 ½ in width to the then-new BET-group outline, with double curvature front and rear screens and peaked roof-domes at either end. They were finished in a mainly cream version of the Sunderland livery and were to B45D layout. Like Doncaster Corporation's slightly later Leyland Royal Tiger Cubs they were purposely designed for the 'intermediate' length and had a wheelbase of 18 ft. They were numbered 46-48 and registered WBR246-8. The first initially was fitted with a constant mesh gearbox, but was swiftly refitted with a direct-air operated Self-Changing Gears unit, featuring a Leyland style 'pedestal' gear change with which the other two were built. Sunderland 48 was the last Atkinson PSV constructed and is preserved, as is no.46. Ironically, the last Seddon PSV design, the Pennine 7, had much more in common with the Alpha than with most previous Seddon bus chassis. However, these three buses had the unusual combination of vacuum-assisted brakes and air-operated Self-Changing Gears gearbox.

=== Atkinson nomenclature ===
This was very simple in style, and a system that in its basics, lasted from 1933 to 1975 consisting of a number for weight (initially estimated payload, but after 1964 maximum gross vehicle or gross-train weight) then a second number for wheels and then the number of cylinders, assuming initially vertically mounted Gardner LW series engines.

Thus an Atkinson 646 would have been a 6-ton payload 4x2 wagon with four wheels and a Gardner 6LW engine.

A 1066A would have had a ten-ton payload, to 6x4 layout and an AEC (seven-seven) powerplant.

During the 1950s as well as the already-existing suffix for engine-type, prefixes H, M and L (for heavy, medium and light duty frames) were adopted, the Alpha had a second prefix P (for passenger) Thus an early Alpha could carry the code:

PL745H (H used for horizontal Gardner engines)

By the mid-1950s Alphas had pre-prefixes depending on whether they had overdrive constant-mesh (C, for coach) or direct-drive synchromesh gearboxes (B, for bus) hence BPL745H for the first 18 Venture examples, the last six being CPL745H.

The double-decker had the unique frame-code D. Whether that stood for double-deck or dropped frame is not clear, but the PD746 designation given to the two built showed a seven-ton payload, four wheels and a Gardner 6LW. Assuming somebody would have wanted a pantechnicon with a dropped-frame at that time from Walton-le-Dale, it may have been a D746.

Relaxation of legally allowed length and widths resulted in further suffix letters: The first two Sunderland buses were L644LWs (lightweight frame, six tons, four wheels, 4LW engines, long wheelbases, wide-track). The New Zealand survivor is given as an L644XLW (extra-long, around 33 ft long).

The final three Alphas were coded PM746HL, viz: passenger, medium-weight frame, six-tonne payload, four wheels, Gardner 6HLW engine, long wheelbase.

Later Atkinson codes included T3246RR for a 32-ton GCW Borderer with a Rolls-Royce Eagle engine. A Rolls-Royce-engined Borderer was T3446RR220 or T3446RR280

The work with the Alpha was also taken into Atki's mainstream wagon business, there were Atkinson customers, particularly breweries, who ordered underfloor engined Atki wagons, enabling a three-seat cab. The platform body had a trap in it so the (Gardner 4HLW) engine could be seen to. Sentinel, Albion, Guy and Dennis had also done the same but not as reliably because they did not use a Gardner.

External image
- "Atkinson Defender KVT 604 P: The very last Atkinson built, Gardner-engined 'Defender' chassis number FC29941, reaches the end of the Walton-le-dale production line in April 1975..."

Atkinson merged with Seddons of Oldham late in 1970. The last "true" Atkinson, a Defender 8-wheel rigid bearing chassis number FC29941, was built at Atkinson's Walton-le-Dale works in 1975. It went to G & B McCready of Newcastle-under-Lyme and carried the registration KVT 604 P. Today it remains with them.

Alongside Seddon's facility at Oldham, the Atkinson works assembled the Seddon Atkinson 400 Series and also the first batch of the new 401 model, before closing at the end of 1981. Oldham remained operational until late 2004, when production was moved to Spain.

== Seddon ==
Seddon Diesel Vehicles were, like Atkinson Lorries, ERF and Motor Traction (Rutland), a commercial vehicle producer who bought-in and assembled proprietary components. Robert and Herbert Seddon were sons of a Salford butcher who in 1919 subsequent to World War I demobilisation bought a Commer with charabanc and van bodies, using it during the week for goods transport and at weekends to run excursions from Salford. Initially a further partner was a family-friend, a dairyman by the name of Foster, so the business was initially a partnership. Foster & Seddon also reconditioned vehicles and ran a bus service from Swinton (Lancs.) to Salford, which was subsequently sold to Salford Corporation, and held an agency for Morris Motors vehicles. In 1937 Robert Seddon spotted a gap in the commercial vehicle market for low-tare diesel-engined lorries and commenced to build his own vehicle out of proprietary units, much of the drawing work being done on his own kitchen table.

This was a 6-ton gvw forward-control lorry chassis with a 6-cylinder Perkins indirect-injection diesel engine. It was first shown at the Scottish Motor show at Kelvin Hall, Glasgow in 1938. Since it weighed under 2.5 long tons (2,540 kg) unladen, it was allowed to travel at 30 mph (48 km/h) unlike most other trucks with a comparable payload. Like Maudslay and ERF, Seddon Motors Ltd were allowed to continue producing commercial vehicle chassis for sale during World War II when many more-established makers such as Leyland Motors, the Associated Equipment Company and direct-competitor Albion Motors had all of their productive capacity diverted to the war effort.

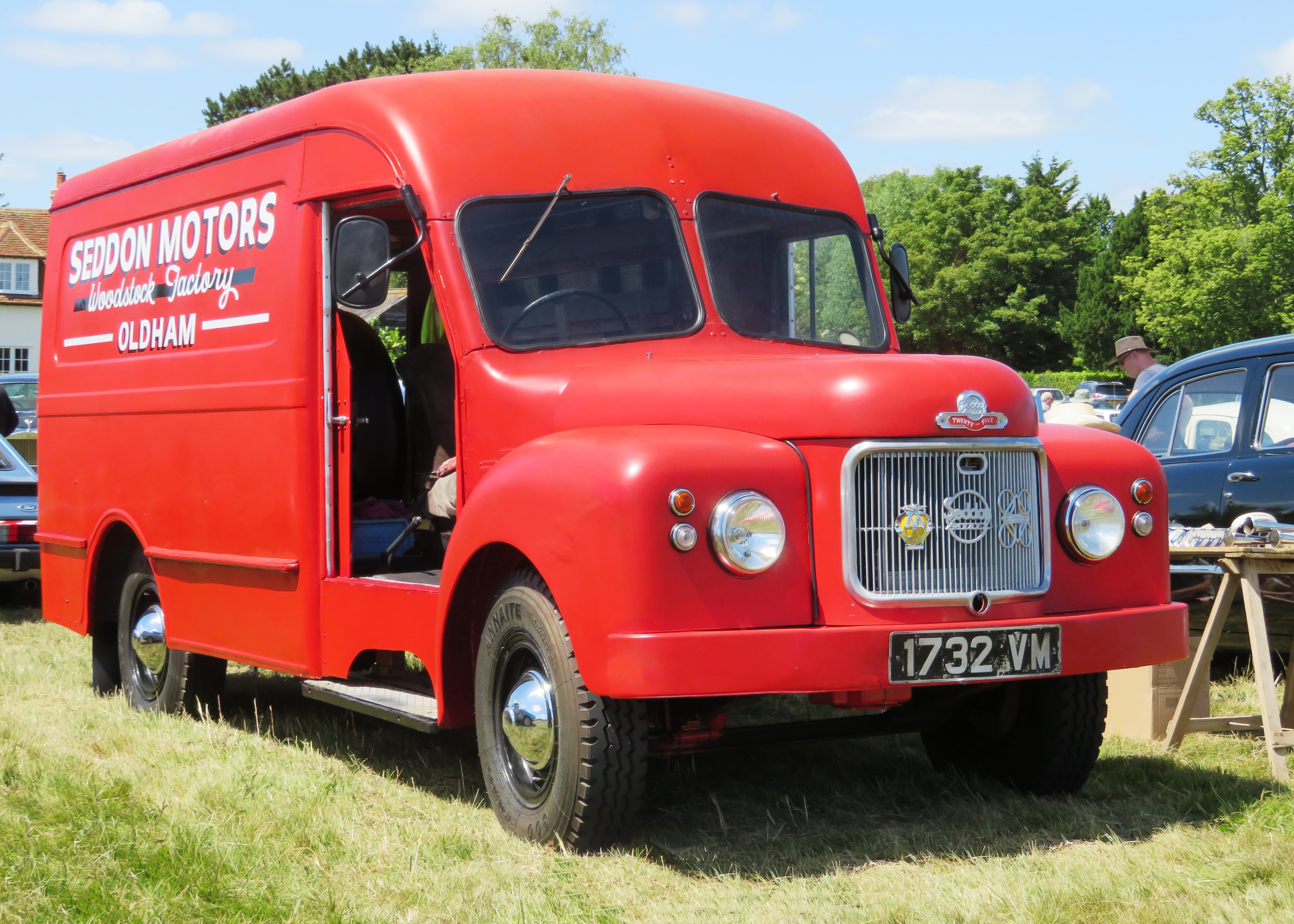
Seddon Diesel 25 integral parcel van (1963)

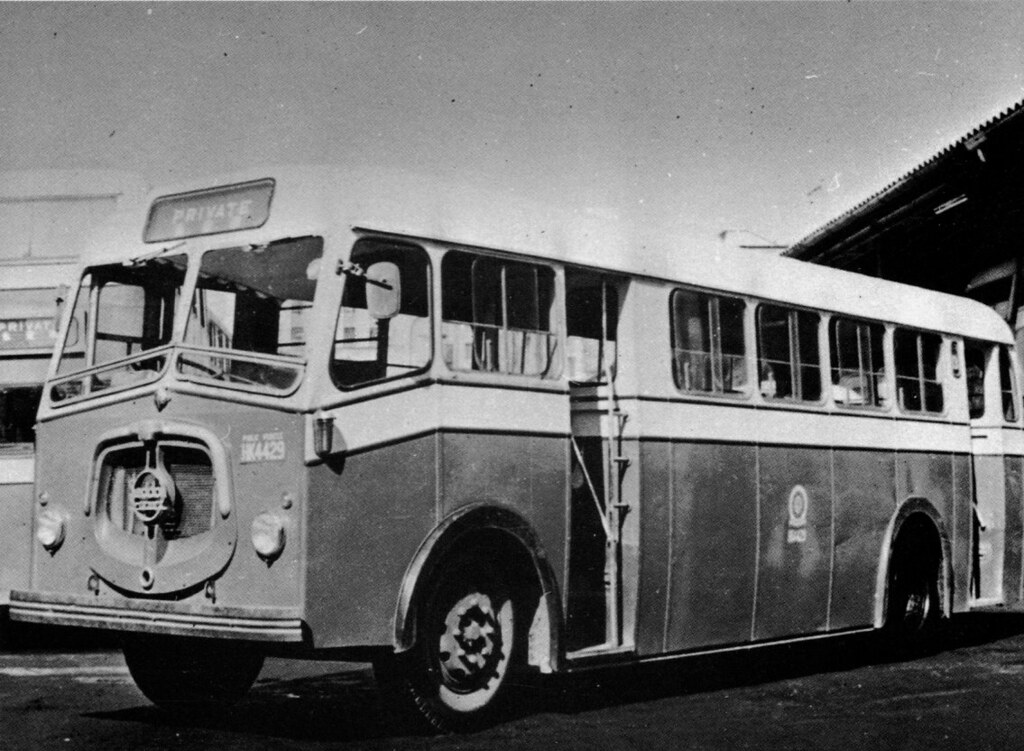
KMB Seddon Mk17

In 1948 Seddon Motors Ltd moved to the Woodstock Works, a former shadow factory in Oldham and were able to expand production from one or two a week to more than ten. At this point they introduced their first passenger chassis the Mark IV. The 26 ft mark IV and 27 ft 6in mark VI were sales successes at home and overseas. Coachbuilders for these chassis included Plaxton and a number of smaller concerns, Seddon also built their own coachwork for these models, mainly for export. Subsequently, Seddon also produced (amongst a bewildering range for which Roman numbers were adopted when the firm became Seddon Diesel Vehicles Ltd in 1950) the Mark 7P. This was a short-wheelbase version of the established theme with four-cylinder Perkins engine and up to 28 seats available within a 21 ft overall length. At the 1952 Earls Court Commercial Motor Show marks 10 and 11 featured vertical Perkins (P6 80 bhp or R6 107 bhp) engines mounted underfloor (when competing underfloor-engined buses used horizontally oriented engines). Although Bedford were to have success with such a layout between 1970 and 1987 the marks 10 and 11 sold poorly, with Seddon, Charles H Roe, Duple and Plaxton bodies on the few known examples. The mid-1950s mark 16 was a 21 ft long bus with a Perkins P4 on the front overhang and the mark 17 was a six-cylinder-engined chassis to similar layout. The mark 18 of the late 1950s, mainly sold to Australia and New Zealand, with local coachwork. It had a vertically mounted Perkins P6 80 bhp engine on the rear overhang. There was also one mark 20 with a Henry Meadows 550 cubic inch horizontal rear-engine exported to Greece and the mark 25P a normal control 18-seat personnel-carrier based on the mark 25 integral parcel van. The bodybuilding business, not only on Seddon and other manufacturer's buses but building lorry cabs and parcel vans for customers such as Manchester Corporation (who ran a parcel delivery service) was registered in its own right as Pennine Coachcraft Ltd (wholly owned by Seddon) in 1960.

From 1966 (with mark numbers climbing into the high twenties), Seddon decided to simplify its nomenclature, wagons were henceforth to be identified as (for example) 16–4 with the first number being the gross vehicle weight and the second the number of wheels. Bus chassis were to be known as Seddon Pennine Mark (x). The first buses using this system produced were for Bermuda and were Seddon Pennine Mark 3, they are believed to be similar to a short-wheelbase Pennine Mark 4 but with Perkins P6 or 6-304 engines or an integral development of the Mark 17 model of similar layout.

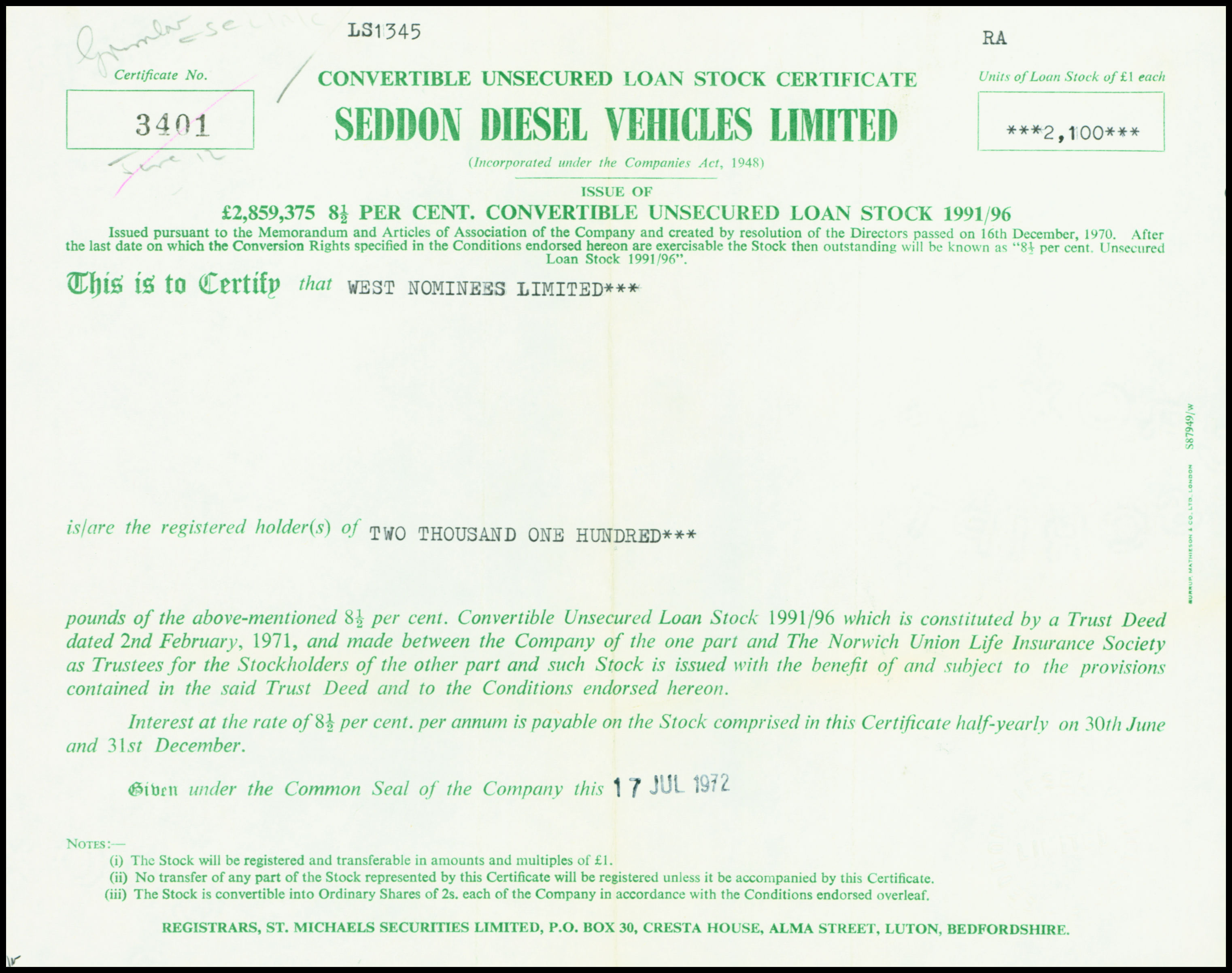
Loan stock certificate of the Seddon Diesel Vehicles Ltd, issued 17. July 1972

From the middle 1950s, Seddon had been almost absent on the home market for bus & coach concerns. A sole mark 19 using many AEC Reliance components in a Seddon-sourced frame with Harrington body being sold in 1960 to Creamline Coaches in Hampshire. But following the success of the Ford R-Series and the Bedford VAL and VAM, Seddon decided to make a similar product, to a variety of wheelbases with Perkins engines; as on the competitors, these were vertically mounted on the front platform. This was launched in 1967 as the Pennine 4, which thanks to vigorous marketing became a strong seller worldwide, the largest order being from Kowloon Motor Bus of Hong Kong, who took 100 11-metre versions with Perkins 170 bhp V8 engines and Pennine Coachcraft 47 seat + 42 standing dual-door bodies. A rear-engined derivative was the Mark 5 (only one sold in the UK, a 45-seat Van Hool coach) and a version with a turbocharged Perkins 6-cylinder engine mounted at the front but under the passenger floor was the Pennine 6. In 1969 a more concerted effort at the UK bus market resulted in the launch of the Pennine RU.

In 1970, Seddon took over Atkinson Lorries to form Seddon Atkinson. In 1974 International Harvester bought Seddon Atkinson, later Pegaso took over the business until it in turn became part of Iveco. The last lorries under the Seddon Atkinson name were built in Oldham in 2004, bus and coach production having ceased in 1983 when the last Pennine 7 models were delivered.

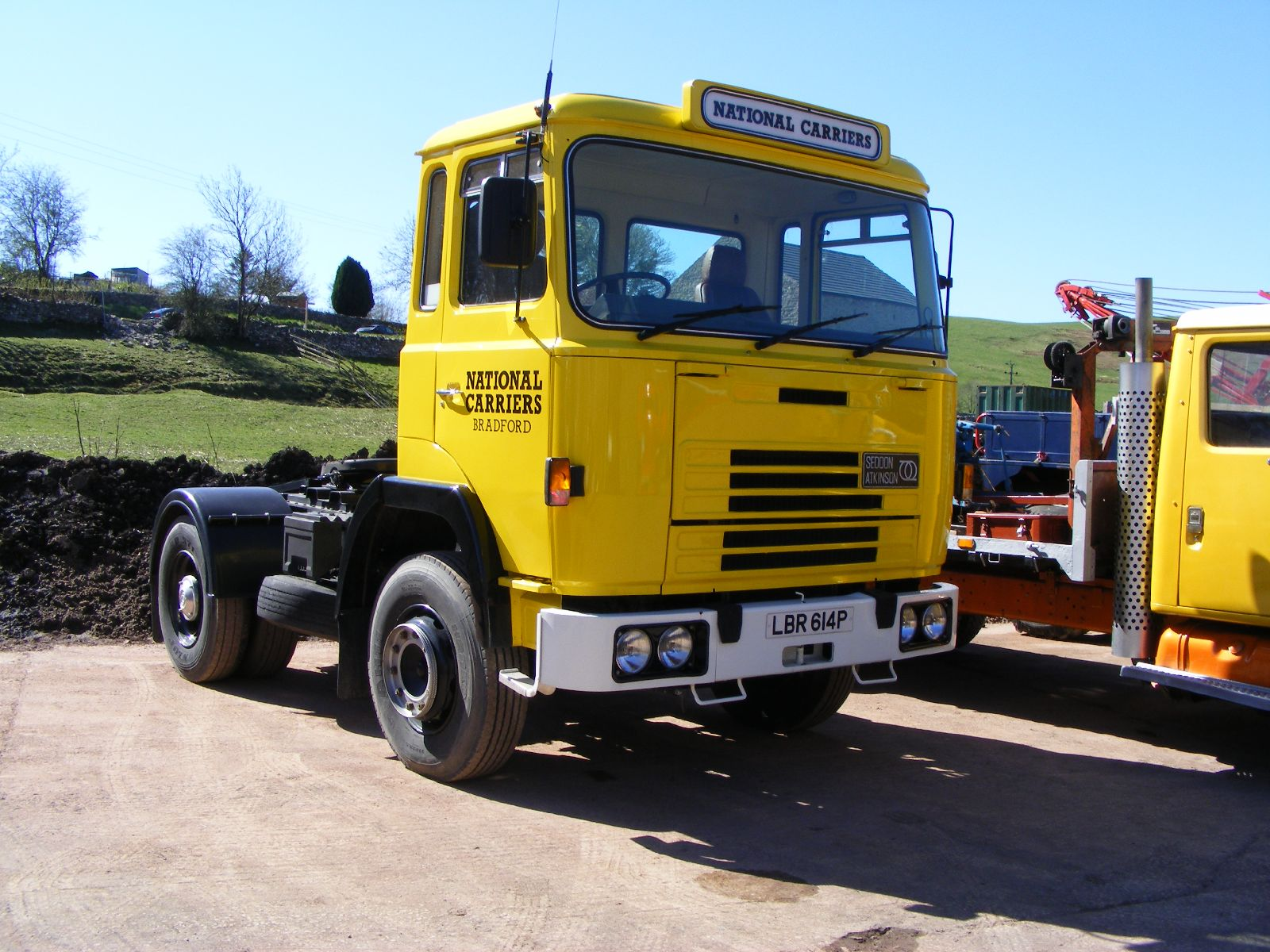
1975 Seddon Atkinson 400 tractor, showing the bumper mounted headlights

Originally the 1 January 1971 merger did not affect the lineup, with Seddon and Atkinson continuing to manufacture their old truck ranges in their respective plants. In 1975, however, a new unified range was presented with modern steel tilt cabs designed by Ogle developed together with Motor Panels. This consisted initially of the 400 series range, followed by the Seddon-based 200 Series in 1976 and then the 3-axle rigid 300 Series - higher numbers corresponding to a higher weight rating.

The Atkinson works manufactured the heavier 400 series while Seddon's Oldham plant built all three lines. The 200 has a lower profile and narrower cab (with a correspondingly lower grille) than do the other two. Meanwhile, the cabin of the 400 is mounted higher up than on the 300, necessitating a bigger front bumper with integrated headlights and different wheelwells. The 200 became the first "Truck of the Year", in 1977. The 200 and 300 both used International diesel engines, with the 300 having a 7.64 L (466 cu in) inline-six with 194 hp (145 kW). The larger 400 was available with a range of diesels from Cummins, Gardner, or Rolls-Royce, with power outputs of up to 320 hp (239 kW). The 400 had a chassis which was mostly Atkinson.

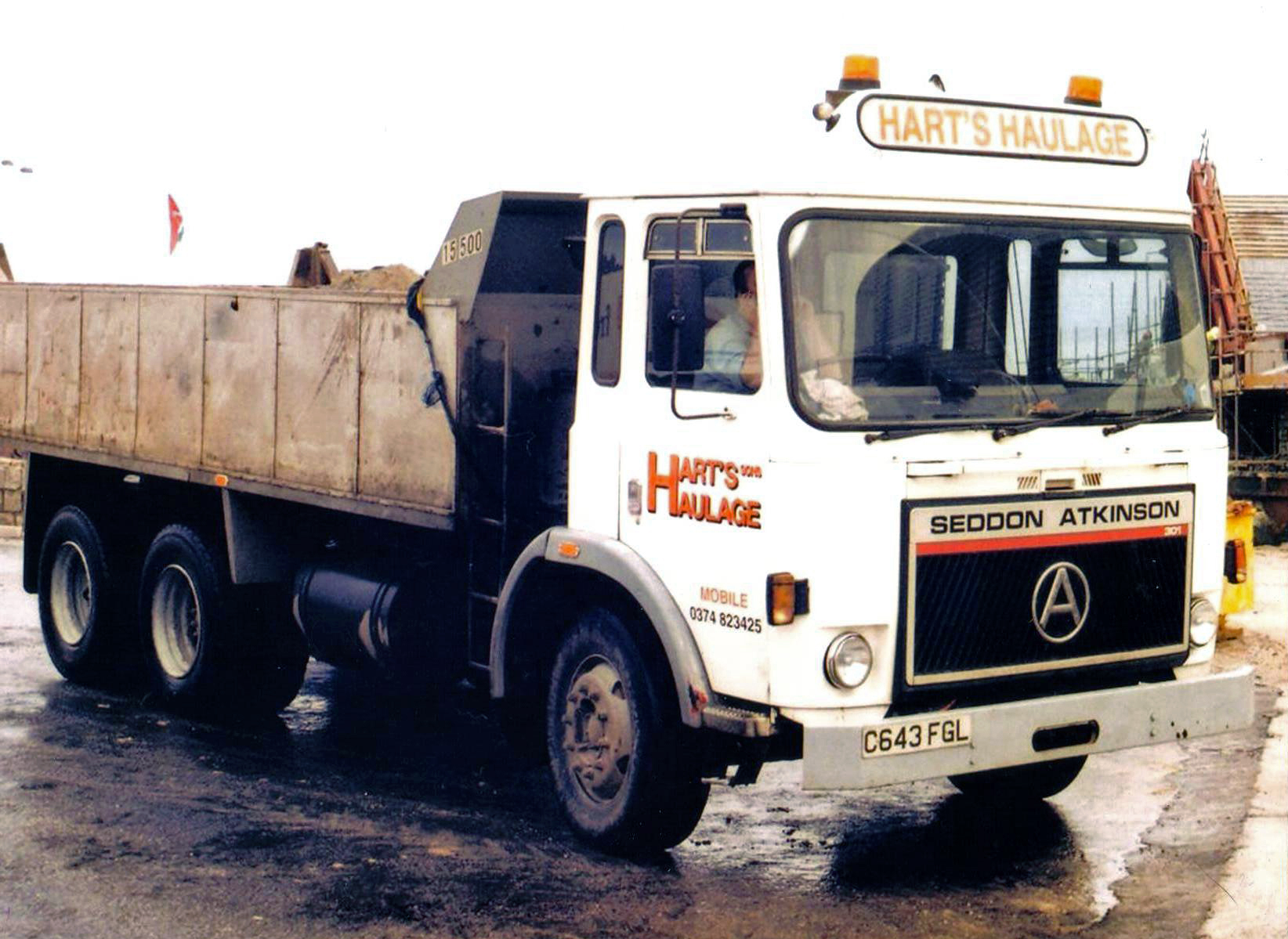
1985 Seddon Atkinson 301

In 1981 the range was updated and became 201, 301, and 401. A few early 401s were built in Atkinson's Walton-le-Dale plant but then all production was shifted to Oldham. The 201 originally came equipped with the 200's 135 hp (101 kW) International engine, although this was changed to a 148 hp (110 kW) Perkins motor following the termination of Seddon Atkinson's relationship with International. The 401 also received an improved interior, the changed grille, and a much improved gear linkage. The Motor Panels trucks had severe rust problems, forcing the introduction of a new anti-corrosion package in the mid-eighties. This period also marks the beginning of the recession which killed off many of the companies which had been buying Seddon Atkinson's trucks.

== Enasa ownership ==
In 1984, International Harvester sold Seddon Atkinson to Enasa of Spain, to make up for a planned Spanish I-H engine factory which had failed to materialize. Sales of Seddon Atkinsons dwindled through the 1980s. Both the 400 and 401 series received heavy complaints over insufficient rust protection on the cabin. In 1985 Seddon Atkinson held about five per cent of the British truck market.

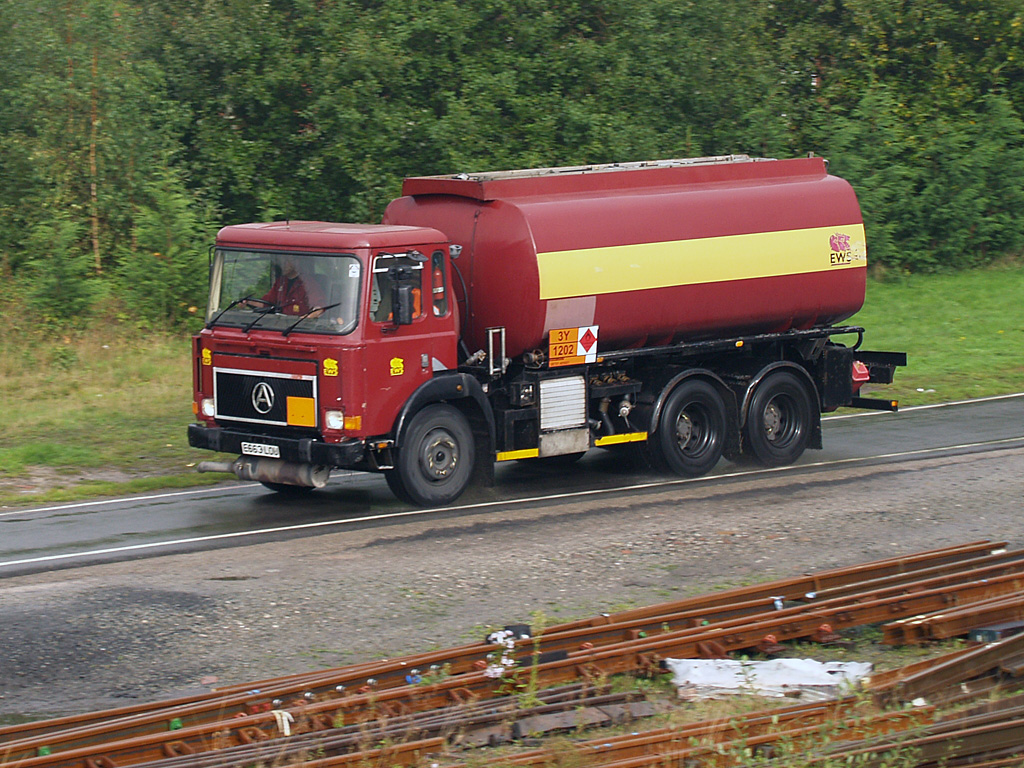
1988 Seddon Atkinson 3-11 road tanker

In the summer of 1986 the lineup received yet another overhaul, starting with the 16 long tons (16,300 kg) 201 which became the 2–11. A 3-11 (also available as a tractor) followed in October 1986, and there was also a short lived 4–11, identifiable by deflectors on the front corners. New engines and various other improvements under the shell were matched by updated, more aerodynamic designs by Ogle. The panels remained the same however. These were trucks intended to have a more premium feel and generally offered more powerful engines, in line with market trends of the day. The 2-11 was the first truck to be fitted with Perkins' new 6.0 litre "Phaser" motor. In spite of the added equipment and more powerful engine, the 2-11 is also lighter than its predecessor. There was a 160 hp (119 kW) turbodiesel or a 180 hp (134 kW) intercooled version.

In 1988 the Strato range was launched, replacing the 401, using S-A's chassis combined with the more modern Pegaso cab from parent company Enasa (itself based on the DAF 95). In 1991 Iveco took over Enasa and acquired Seddon Atkinson as part of the deal. The Strato 2 subsequently utilised the Iveco Eurotech cabin. In 2005 production was moved to Iveco's Spanish facilities, but sales were low - only 284 units in the UK in 2005 - and in late 2006 it was announced that production of the niche Seddon Atkinsons had been stopped. The range had been sold across the UK by a network of 13 distributors, comprising a mix of dedicated Seddon Atkinson dealers together with dealers who also sold Iveco models. In December 2009, Iveco announced that the Seddon Atkinson brand would be withdrawn.

== Sources and Bibliography ==
Ref. ALH (AtkinsonLorries Holdings) Collection, The Modern Records Centre, University of Warwick

- Halton, Maurice J., The Impact of Conflict and Political Change on Northern Industrial Towns, 1890 to 1990, MA Dissertation, Faculty of Humanities and Social Science, Manchester Metropolitan University September 2001
