= Fernando Alcón Sáez =

Spanish politician

Fernando Alcón Sáez MP
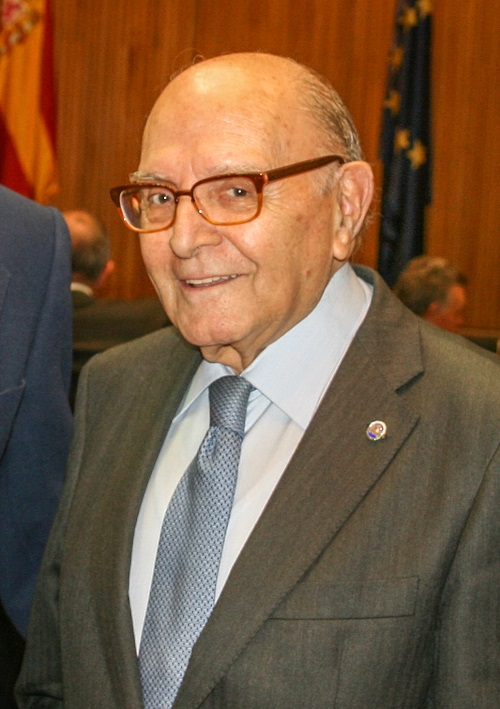
- Fernando Alcón (2015)

Diputado en Cortes Generales de España

Personal details
- Born: 1932 Madrid, Spain
- Died: 2016 (aged 83–84) Madrid, Spain
- Party: Unión de Centro Democrático
- Spouse: María José Espín García
- Children: 2

Fernando Alcón Sáez (Ávila, May 24, 1932-Madrid, October 10, 2016). He is married to María José Espín, and has two children (Diego and Fernando). He's a businessman and industrialist from Avila, a politician of the Spanish Transition and a close friend of Adolfo Suárez, who was the first President of Spain in democracy, since his childhood.

== Biography ==
Born in Ávila in 1932, he studied high school at the Colegio de Nuestra Señora de Lourdes in Valladolid. He studied law in Zaragoza and business administration at the School of Industrial Organization (EOI) in Madrid. He continued the family business tradition by founding, at the beginning of the 1960s, the Pegaso Concession (automobiles) in Ávila, a Spanish auto-truck brand (ENASA), and British Leyland (later Rover).

For ten years he was president of the Ávila Chamber of Commerce and Industry (1970-1979). Also, he was President of the Spanish Association of Pegaso Dealers and of FEDAUTO, the Spanish Automotive Federation.

He entered the politics of the Spanish Transition at the call of Adolfo Suárez. He led the list of deputies for the Province of Ávila of the Unión de Centro Democrático (UCD) party in the first free democratic elections on June 15, 1977. He was elected deputy, obtaining great success for the UCD by obtaining the 3 possible deputies from the province.

Subsequently, in the General Elections of Spain in March 1979, he returned to appear as the head of the UCD list, obtaining the same result: the 3 deputies of the province. This fact has not been repeated in Ávila in subsequent elections up to the present date.

At the end of July 1982, after the creation of the Democratic and Social Center (CDS) by Adolfo Suárez, he became part of this new party. A few months after the June 1986 elections, he was appointed CDS National Organization Secretary, holding office until 1990.

He was Senator of the CDS for Ávila in the October 1989 elections.

In 1991 he left politics, returning to his business activities.
