= Pegaso Troner =

Spanish truck model

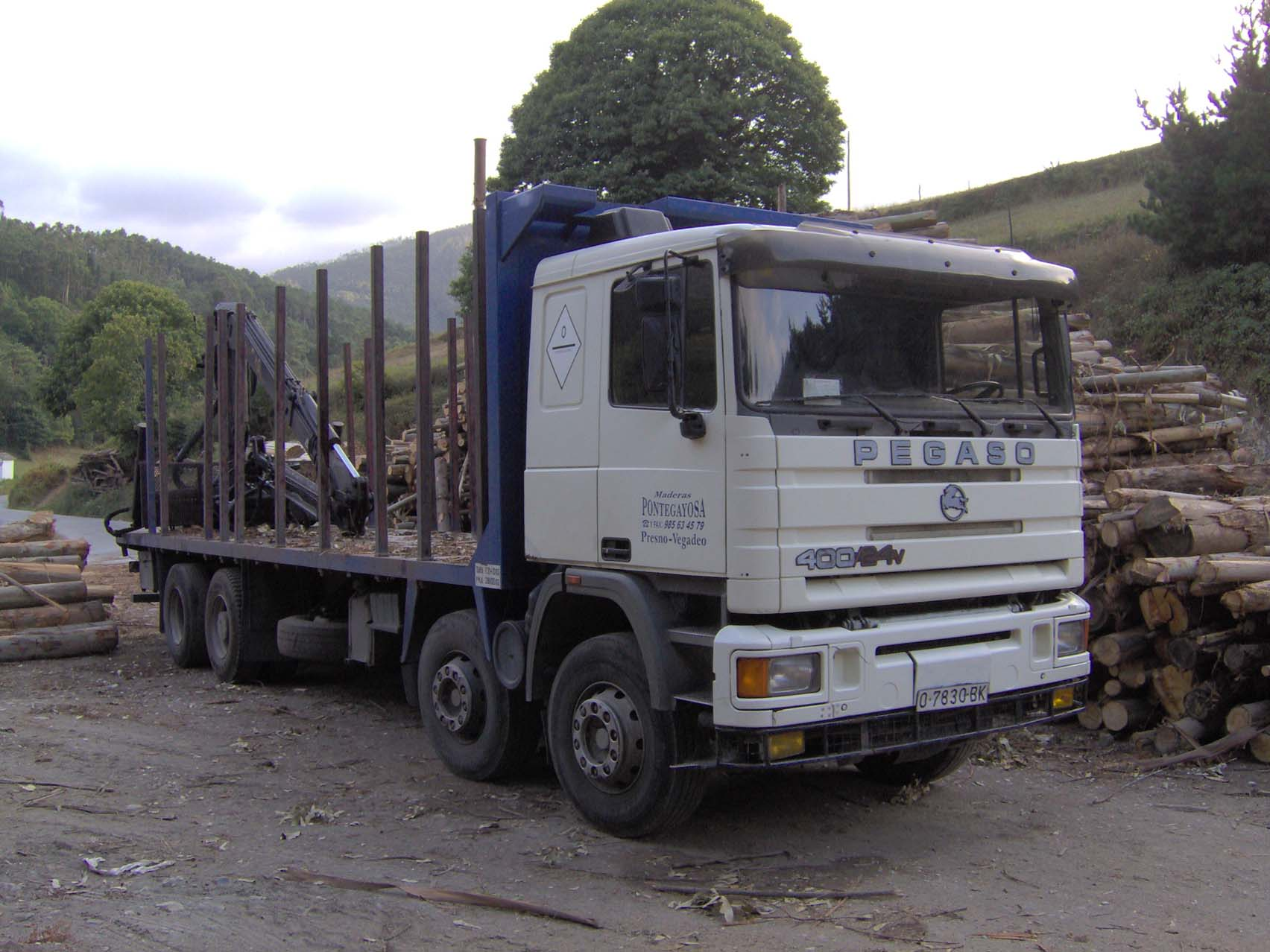
Crane equipped 400 hp 8x2 Troner in North Spain.

The Pegaso Troner made its debut at the 1987 Barcelona Motor show and was to be the last truck model developed by the Spanish manufacturer. Built at Pegaso's Barajas plant, the Troner featured the all-new Cabtec cab developed jointly with DAF Trucks who sold it as the DAF 95. Pegaso used their own 12 litre, straight–six engine, and 16 speed ZF gearbox. Initially rated at 360 hp (265 kW), power was later raised to 370 and 400 hp (272 and 294 kW). The range encompassed 4x2 & 6x4 tractor units, 6x4, 8x2 & 8x4 rigids. In the UK, some operators had 4x2 tractors converted to 6x2 midlift, Southworth of Chorley were one company offering such a conversion.

The Troner was Enasa's last effort to keep pace with the European truck market but it failed to stop the company from losing market share. Eventually control of ENASA was taken over by the Iveco group. Nevertheless, Troners were popular in Spain, and also found a market in France and the Benelux countries. In the UK a large order was placed by the now defunct GB Express. Production of the Troner ceased in July 1993.
