= SAVA (Spain) =

SAVA logo

Sava 213 vans

Sociedad Anónima de Vehículos Automoviles (SAVA) was a Spanish producer of light and medium commercial vehicles, based in Valladolid.

== History ==
The company started in 1957 with a three-wheeled vehicle called the SAVA P-54, which could carry a two-ton load. This design was originally by FADA (Fábrica de Automóviles de Aluminio, or "Aluminium Car Factory"). SAVA switched to make a Barreiros-engined light truck called the P-58 in 1959; this truck had weight capacities between 2 and 2.5 tonnes (4,400 and 5,500 lb).

From 1960 to 1963, SAVA built heavier models based on several British-designed Austin, Morris and BMC commercial vehicles but with Spanish-built cabs. They were marketed as SAVA, SAVA-Austin, or SAVA-BMC. They subsequently gave way to the successful SAVA S-76 model, a large van, and the well-known Austin FG.

SAVA signed a cooperation agreement with French Berliet in April 1964; as a result, SAVA assembled that company's heavy, 18-tonne GBH truck from 1966 through 1969. It was sold as the SAVA-Berliet GPS-12 and was SAVA's first and only heavyweight truck.

In early 60s, Sava were making steel cabs of their own design, and from then on only the Sava badge was used. Soon a range of lorries was introduced, starting with the SAVA WF-3, a bonneted model that was based on the designs of the earlier, British models. Another SAVA that existed was the SAVA FF diesel FC (forward control) a 5-ton lorry and an improved SAVA FG 7-ton truck model was launched all of which were based on old BMC models and were mostly identical to those made in the UK before.

In 1965 Enasa, the maker of Pegaso trucks, took over SAVA, but the SAVA brand subsisted until 1969, after which the range was rebadged as Pegaso. Until the 1980s, these were renamed and produced as the well-known Pegaso SAVA J4-1100 range of vans and there was also the popular SAVA FC light trucks, coaches, minibuses and panel vans all of these were 6-ton models, they were sometimes also badged as SAVA-PEGASO.

Production of these SAVA vans ended in the late 1980s when Enasa was acquired by Iveco in 1990. Pegaso SAVA J4 and FC models can still be found all over Spain due to their low running-costs and plentiful spares. SAVA diesel engines were also popular as retrofits in passenger cars, being particularly favored by taxi drivers.

SAVA trucks were used by the Spanish Armed Police in their anti-riot operations.
