= Seddon Pennine RU =

Overview
- Manufacturer: Seddon Diesel Vehicles; Seddon Atkinson

Body and chassis
- Doors: 1-2
- Floor type: Step entrance

Powertrain
- Engine: Diesel: 8.6 L Gardner 6HLW horizontal I6; 10.45 L Gardner 6HLX horizontal I6
- Transmission: Self-Changing Gears direct-acting air operated semi-automatic epicyclic, electric control, 4 or 5 speeds

Dimensions
- Length: 33ft (10m) or 36ft (11m) for 35-51 seats

The Seddon Pennine RU was a rear-engined single-decker bus built by Seddon Diesel Vehicles/Seddon Atkinson between 1969 and 1974.

== RU description ==
The Seddon Pennine RU (for rear-underfloor, the location of the engine) was launched in 1969 as a competitor in the market for rear-engine single deckers. Although a very different product to the Pennine 4 it followed the same market-driven philosophy. Viz: offer the same major features as the most in-demand model but cut out most of the complexity, some of the purchase price and offer it for sale quickly and cheaply with the choice of in-house Pennine Coachcraft bodywork. The market leader was in the rear-engine single-deck segment was the Bristol RE and Seddon decided to use similar mechanical units, notably Gardner engines and Self-Changing Gears semi-automatic transmission.

Whereas the RE used a gently ramped frame on bus variants. Seddon decided to use a straight frame using 8in channel longitudinals and mainly tubular cross-members which was oriented to rise from front to rear at about 5 degrees from the horizontal. Wheelbases offered were either 16 ft 6in for 33 ft coachwork or 18 ft 6in for 36 ft bodies. Instead of the complex drive-line arrangement of the RE a straightforward T-drive layout was employed. The rear end of the 10.45-litre Gardner 6HLX (the 8.6 litre 6HLW was optional) was mounted below and hard against the rear cross member on the short version, driving directly via a fluid flywheel into a Self-Changing Gears 4 or 5-speed direct-operating epicyclic gearbox, air-operated with electrical control. The Eaton spiral-bevel rear axle, to a variety of different final drive ratios, was just ahead of the power pack and a very short drive shaft was fitted with resilient rubber-based joints. Originally on the long-wheelbase version a similar arrangement was employed but with the engine further from the rear of the frame. Conventional leaf springs were used, but the spring shackle-pins were fitted with polyurethane bushes, which would not require greasing and so reduce maintenance costs. The braking was full air-operated using Girling wedge-type drum brakes. A spring operated air parking-brake was employed, power steering for the Seddon-designed front-axle was optionally available. Unlike the RE and the Leyland Panther the radiator was not carried at the front but hung from the offside of the chassis in mid-wheelbase, ahead of the rear axle. A combined saloon heating and ventilation system with a thermostatically-controlled heat-exchanger and reversible fan drive was announced but this was never made available to customers.

The Pennine Coachcraft body was a jig-built aluminium-framed structure similar to that of the standard body fitted to the Pennine 4. It was directly attached to the Pennine RU chassis frame, saving further cost and weight. Although this body was intended as the standard offering, other coachbuilders' products could be fitted. In the event three other makes of bodies were fitted to the RU, Plaxton used a steel-reinforced hardwood structure whilst East Lancashire Coachbuilders and Charles H Roe both used steel-tube framing.

The initial prototype TBU598G, registered in March 1969, carried a Pennine Coachcraft 41 seat dual-door body on the short-wheelbase version of the chassis and Seddon demonstrated it to a number of municipal and company fleets mainly in the Pennines, commencing its career in Halifax. The second prototype was to the 36 ft length with 45 seats and dual doors. It was exhibited at the 1970 Commercial Motor show at Earls Court in the livery of Crosville where it was overshadowed by the debuts of the Leyland National and the Metro-Scania; it was then registered ABU451J and served as a demonstrator across Great Britain. Initial list prices complete with body started at £6,200 which was substantially cheaper than an equivalent ECW-bodied RE, lead times were very good because Seddon had expanded into adjacent premises in order to set up a dedicated bus-production facility. Furthermore, the RU was the first bus chassis designed to meet the requirements of the New Bus Grant announced in the Transport Act 1968. This government grant initially covered 25% of the first cost of grant-compliant buses used on local bus services, from 1971 this was increased to 50%.

By the end of 1970 a further 46 chassis had been built, bodied and delivered. Production then rose to a peak of 109 (including the second prototype) in 1971, dropping back slightly in 1972 to 99 then only 13 were delivered in 1973 and six in 1974, so 76% of chassis were built in two years, the municipal market was moving back toward double decks and the rival Leyland National was outselling every other single-deck bus.

Production ceased in March 1974 after 274 were completed, the last chassis numerically were numbers 56041/2 which were ordered by Huddersfield and delivered to West Yorkshire PTE in September and October 1974 respectively (registered PVH 452/453M).

== Customers ==
From 1966-9 Pennine had bodied increasing numbers of rear-engined single deck buses, and by the time body production ended in 1975 they had, besides the RU, bodied AEC Swifts, Daimler Fleetlines, Leyland Atlanteans and Leyland Panthers, but the largest number of home-market Pennine bodies on third-party chassis had gone on Bristol RELL and RESL, with Reading Corporation being the largest customer with 28 bodies to its own outline on a short-wheelbase version of the RELL.

The majority of customers for the RU also took the Pennine body. This was fitted to 69% of RU production (23% carried Plaxton bodies with 4% shares for both East Lancashire and Roe). It sold best in Cheshire (37%, all Crosville), Lancashire (36%, spread between one PTE, one independent, and six corporations, total also including both demonstrators) and Yorkshire (22% over one PTE, one independent and four corporations), the first customer to take delivery was Doncaster Corporation who took their first fourteen in the early months of 1970 Huddersfield Corporation also had short, dual-door versions in service with H registrations (thus registered prior to 1 August 1970), Lancashire United were the third customer to get H-registration examples, their first twenty. Huddersfield were to take 22 and Doncaster 25. Other municipal customers included Accrington Corporation (5), Blackburn Corporation (6), Halifax Joint Omnibus Committee (3), Burnley, Colne and Nelson JOC (20), Darlington Corporation (8), Lytham St Annes (6), Morecambe Corporation (6), Rotherham Corporation (9) and Southampton Corporation (5).

Accrington and Blackburn took East Lancashire bodies on theirs, Halifax and Rotherham chose Plaxton Derwent II bodies as did Huddersfield for its final two and the rest took the Pennine Coachcraft option. The final 11 for Doncaster were the only ones with Charles H Roe bodies.

Due to central government legislation English and Welsh county and borough council boundaries were changed and from 1974 metropolitan counties were created in England in the West Midlands, Greater Manchester, Merseyside, Tyne and Wear, South Yorkshire and West Yorkshire. Most of the metropolitan areas already had passenger transport executives but these were established in the two metropolitan Yorkshire counties (which together comprised the majority of the historic West Riding) thus South Yorkshire absorbed the Rotherham and Doncaster RUs and West Yorkshire the Halifax/Calderdale and Huddersfield vehicles.

Outside the metropolitan counties, local government changes caused some fleets to merge (e.g. Lancaster with Morecambe & Heysham, Blackburn with Darwen) while others were renamed, Burnley, Colne and Nelson becoming Burnley & Pendle and Accrington changing title to Hyndburn.

Independent customers for the RU were headed by Lancashire United Transport (LUT) of Atherton who took delivery of fifty over 1970-1. These had a special version of the Plaxton Derwent II body supplied only to this operator featuring flat rather than curved windscreens, deleting peaks on front and rear domes and having glazing and general appearance similar to Plaxton's previous (1958–66) Highway bus body. They also had front-mounted radiators, specified by the operator and unique to their RUs. As well as being fitted to the fifty RU which were dual-door 40-seaters on short chassis, the same body went on two batches of Bristol RESL6G, twenty B42D in 1967/8 and ten DP41F in 1973/4. Subsequently LUT (and other outliers such as the Calderdale Region of West Yorkshire PTE) were prevailed upon to take the standard version of the Derwent II.

Other independent customers for the RU took the Pennine body, all in long single-door form with 51 bus seats; these were Garelochhead Coach Services (1), Dodds (AA Service) Troon (2), Grahams Bus Service of Paisley (1), and Reliance of Sutton on the Forest, North Yorkshire (2).

When the second National Bus Company order table was published on 30 July 1970 tabulating orders for subsidiaries in 1971 the biggest surprises were two orders each calling for 100 single-deck buses. Midland Red (whose last home-built BMMO bus had just been delivered) ordered 100 Ford R192 with 45-seat Plaxton Derwent II bodies, whilst Crosville ordered 100 Seddon Pennine RU complete with Pennine Coachcraft bodies.

Crosville's Pennine RU were all to 36 ft length, the order broke into two sub-batches of fifty, half were single door with 47 coach seats for long limited-stop journeys and half were 45 seat dual-door buses for intensive urban operations. Crosville had taken the last of its 593 Bristol Lodekkas in 1968 and was concentrating on renewing its single-deck fleet, which at the time still included a few half-cab Bristol L-types, it did not order its first VRs until 1975. It ordered 288 REs between 1964 and 1973. Seddon started delivering this (joint) record order for complete buses in April 1971 and completed it just over a year later in May 1972.

The final RU to be delivered to a new customer was equipped with a Chloride sponsored battery-electric driveline and was called the "Silent Rider". It was sold to SELNEC who numbered it EX61 in its experimental series, registering it XVU387M. The Chloride battery pack weighed four tonnes and the vehicle (unladen but for those batteries) weighed 13 tonnes (almost double the unladen weight of the Gardner-powered version) so payload was limited, by the axles fitted, to one tonne which equalled a capacity of B41D + 9 standing and although it featured regenerative braking the bus (like Lucas battery-electric Seddon Midi EX62 XVU364M which followed in 1975) was not a success. The Silent Rider project alone cost £100,000 at mid-1970s values, promotional tours to Sheffield and Chicago, Illinois, United States may have been prestigious for the Executive and for the manufacturers of vehicle and batteries, who were both major employers of voters in the PTE area, but Cook County Transit and the South Yorkshire PTE were, lacking the electrical-charging and cell-care infrastructure installed in a Manchester garage as part of the project, able to get even less use out of the thing than Greater Manchester who tried to employ its advertised 100-mile range by using it sporadically on one morning and one afternoon peak-time journey on routes 202/3. It was out of service by 1976.

== In service ==
Although conceived as a bus chassis, a number were used for interurban services, among these were the three ordered by GG Hillditch for the Halifax JOC. These (315-317, MJX15-17J) carried Plaxton Derwent II bodies with 45 full-coach seats on a flat floor with a three-step entrance to the front platform and then a further transverse step into the saloon. Styling on these three was to Mr Hillditch's standard single-deck outline of the time with a large projecting two-line destination indicator above the BET-style double curvature screen, This large and legible advertisement projected from a rounded front dome, with a similar rounded rear-end. These were specified for limited-stop 'trans-pennine' services and in the year after delivery became the 'top-shed' buses for Calderdale JOC (which was a merger in 1971 of Halifax, Todmorden and National Bus Company interests.) route 8 from Leeds via Halifax and Todmorden to Burnley. These were replaced on this front-line work after a year, being succeeded by similar-looking AEC Reliances which in their turn gave way to similar-looking Leyland Leopards. When West Yorkshire PTE was formed all three Calderdale RU were moved to Huddersfield, concentrating the fleet's collection of the type in one place.

The single-door half of the Crosville batch were initially allocated to long distance Anglo-Welsh services. Numbers of other RUs though used on bus services were fitted either with Seddon's design of individual semi-coach seat, as on the 47-seat Crosville examples, or other designs of luxury seats, whilst some of the Huddersfield ones were delivered seatless and had Roe coach seats removed from AEC Regals absorbed with the takeover of Hanson buses fitted at the Huddersfield works prior to entry into service, this re-using of seats and internal fittings was something of a Huddersfield trait, throughout its existence, sometimes it got entire bodies re-chassied.

Only one RU was fitted with a luxury-coach body however, this was ordered by Accrington and delivered to Hyndburn as its 38 (STC986M). This carried one of the three East Lancashire 'Lancastrian' coach bodies built, the only one to 10-metre length. It was an ungainly vehicle with a high ramped floor, carrying 39 Plaxton seats, all forward-facing, Large curved side screens were used on the four main-bays, of a type used on contemporary Mercedes-Benz and Neoplan coaches leading to a parabolic roof contour, but aft of the rear axle flat Willowbrook-pattern bus glazing was used, offside and nearside emergency doors were fitted. A wide two-leaf entry/exit door was fitted forward of the front axle to ensure grant-compliance, and the front was basically flat with a very large angled flat-glass windscreen surmounted by a peak reminiscent of a British Rail 'Western' diesel-hydraulic locomotive. Luggage was contained in underfloor wheelbase lockers as in contemporary Bristol RE coaches. It spent a quiet life, working peak hour extras and select coach hires.

The RU was intended as a municipal bus, and 42% went to Corporation bus fleets, NBC (the Crosville order) took 36%, and independents (mainly Lancashire United) accounted for 20%. The other buses were the two demonstrators and three delivered to PTEs. The formation of the West Yorkshire PTE gave them an instant fleet of 24 with two on delivery, South Yorkshire PTE inherited 34 with the Doncaster and Rotherham Fleets, and upon purchasing Lancashire United on 1 January 1976 Greater Manchester Transport found its fleet of RU climbing from one to fifty-one. The original demonstrator was sold to and operated by Green Bus Service of Rugeley from 1971 until 1974 when Midland Red took them over. Midland Red sold it to a dealer and it was purchased for the enlarged Lancaster operation. Thus out of the four sectors purchasing RU, this bus served in three of them and briefly gave NBC a second RU operator.

== Problems in operation ==
Drivers generally found handling on Seddon RUs vague, and steering imprecise. Geoffrey Hillditch refers to 'a most peculiar feeling' when driving one. Steering bushes, axle thrust pads and king pins were less durable than they should have been, adding to steering troubles, whilst unbalanced front wheels could cause the steering wheel to wobble. Weight was biased too much toward the rear and this exacerbated handling problems. The polyurethane bushes wore 'alarmingly' and were replaced by traditional (regularly) greased chromium-plated brass units. Springs were not substantial enough.

The steering box mountings also needed to be reinforced. Radiator mountings were also initially inadequate and had to be strengthened. The air cleaner was located aft of the nearside rear wheel and although this was hard to reach had to be attended-to regularly if engine performance was not to suffer. The main battery switch was also located in a position where it was vulnerable to road splash and had to be shielded, some of the wiring was also 'suspect' sometimes causing fires and had to be re-routed

The brakes were unfamiliar to bus engineers who were used to cam-operated brakes and drivers complained that the buses could not pull-up in a straight line. In the Classic Bus reader poll for the worst bus of all time the RU failed to make the top ten but J. Whiteing summarises the type thus: 'Provided they started they would run and run, but stopping was a case for hope and prayer.' The Pennine bodies were found to be rather too light and tended to crack around the chassis mounting points, whilst the dual-door versions also had localised fractures around the centre exit door.

Jim Sambrooks of Doncaster Corporation and South Yorkshire PTE recalled a Doncaster engineering foreman saying "If it's a Seddon it's a dead 'un." Again referring to the unlikelihood of pulling up in a straight line, he also recalled the first batch had car-type handbrake levers which disintegrated in use; later upon becoming a fitter he discovered that the brake adjusters (of two different sorts on the different batches) were virtually inaccessible, that spring shackle-pins often needed to be knocked out which was equally difficult, that topping up the fluid flywheel was "nigh-on impossible" and only done when a bus developed gearbox-slip, and that in order to remove the engines for overhaul, Doncaster engineers actually had to cut-away the rear cross member and bolt in a removable piece of girder once they had done. Problems on the Doncaster Pennine bodies included rivets falling out and frame-fractures above the exit door.

John S Hinchliffe singles out Huddersfield no 45 (XCX245J) as "the only one that stopped in a straight line, was smooth to drive, had positive steering and gave a smooth ride". Huddersfield's 21 Pennines were all built as dual-door vehicles but were converted by the manufacturer to single-door, in the case of 51 after only nine months in service, while this was done Huddersfield were lent a fully automatic Pennine VI Interurban demonstrator, which they used on service to Oldham. Mr Hinchliffe sums up his experience of the type by saying they were 'reliable' but 'not popular due to their inability to hold the road'.

However one major problem was the proximity of the engine to the rear axle, and on 33 ft versions many different designs of drive-shaft were employed but no effective way was found of insulating the engine and gearbox from road shocks. Crosville had all of its 36 ft models converted with a revised engine and gearbox mounting closer to the rear cross member, allowing a longer universal-jointed drive shaft to be put in place, this arrangement was also applied to later long-wheelbase RU as built. To cover for vehicles being modified, Seddon Atkinson lent Crosville the prototype Pennine 7 (UBU72N), which remained with Crosville after the work was done.

Unlike their Bristol REs which were cascaded to more remote parts of the company's North Wales hinterland as newer replacements arrived, Crosville's Seddons were generally kept close to the central works at Chester. Crosville did allocate some dual-purpose RU to its South Cambrian division in 1975 but they were not popular, finding themselves allocated to non-service work including swimming bath contracts before they were returned across the border in 1976. By 1981 Crosville had started to fit some 6HLX engines from Seddons it had withdrawn on expiry of their certificates of initial fitness into its Mark 1 Leyland Nationals. They were upgraded to 6HLXB specification prior to fitting.

The Garelochhead bus, 106 (CSN716K) a single-door 51-seater was the company's first 11m vehicle and was bought in July 1972 for its Helensburgh town service. It was sold in late 1977 to Dodds for spares and, its career described as 'troubled', was reported in process of being scrapped by January 1978.

Rotherham's nine 44-seat Plaxton Derwents were its last single deckers, they entered service in late 1972, replacing 1963 AEC Reliances, and were withdrawn by SYPTE on expiry of their certificates of initial fitness. Glynne S Pegg recalled two of them failing him on journeys to work in the same week.

== In retrospect, later copies by Ward Brothers and Dennis ==
The late batch of eight 11-metre versions supplied to Darlington Transport were well liked by the operator and they tried to commission more from Seddon Atkinson after the end of production, this was not to be and Darlington (whose other single-decks were then Daimler Roadliners and Daimler Fleetlines) instead bought four dual-door Leyland Leopards in 1977, their next two new vehicle orders went to Dennis for single deck Marshall-bodied Dominators, then in 1983 they got Ward Motors Ltd to build them six RU-like vehicles called the GRXI (for Gardner, Rear-engine 11 metres. This latter in Roman numerals). These differed from the RU only in having 180 bhp Gardner 6HLXB engines, ZF power steering and Wadham Stringer Vanguard B45D bodies, a further six were optioned, but the Ward Brothers' company went bankrupt before these could be built.

Hyndburn 38 was one of the longer-lived examples of the Pennine RU, enduring in service until 1984 when they were replaced by the only short-wheelbase examples of the Dennis Falcon HC, which derived some of its features from the Bristol RE, but unlike the earlier Falcon H had a driveline closely resembling that of the Pennine RU. The direct replacement for number 38, the coach seated example, was recently reported to still be working on Malta.

The last RU to run as a PSV is understood to have been new to Lytham St. Annes STJ847L which was withdrawn by East End Coaches, Clydach in South Wales in late 2000. East End bought several RUs between 1980 and 1991 from Burnley, Fylde and Darlington. In 1997 it still operated Fylde STJ847/50L, Darlington WHN462/3/8M and had WHN466/7M and RHG314K as spares donors. A fire in 1999 destroyed WHN463/6/7M and damaged STJ850L and only STJ847L continued in use. Both Fylde ones, WHN462/8M and RHG314K were disposed of in spring 2001, STJ847L for preservation, the remainder for scrap.

== Survivors ==
As far as is known, only 2 Seddon Pennine RUs survive: both in preservation, these being former Lytham St. Annes /Fylde Borough Transport 47 STJ847L (Lancastrian Transport Trust) and Southampton Corporation 15 BCR379K (Southampton & District Transport Heritage Trust).

Although the "Silent Rider", was stored for the Museum of Transport, Greater Manchester it was vandalised and found to be beyond economic restoration and reluctantly scrapped.
