= Enasa =

Spanish vehicle manufacturing company

ENASA
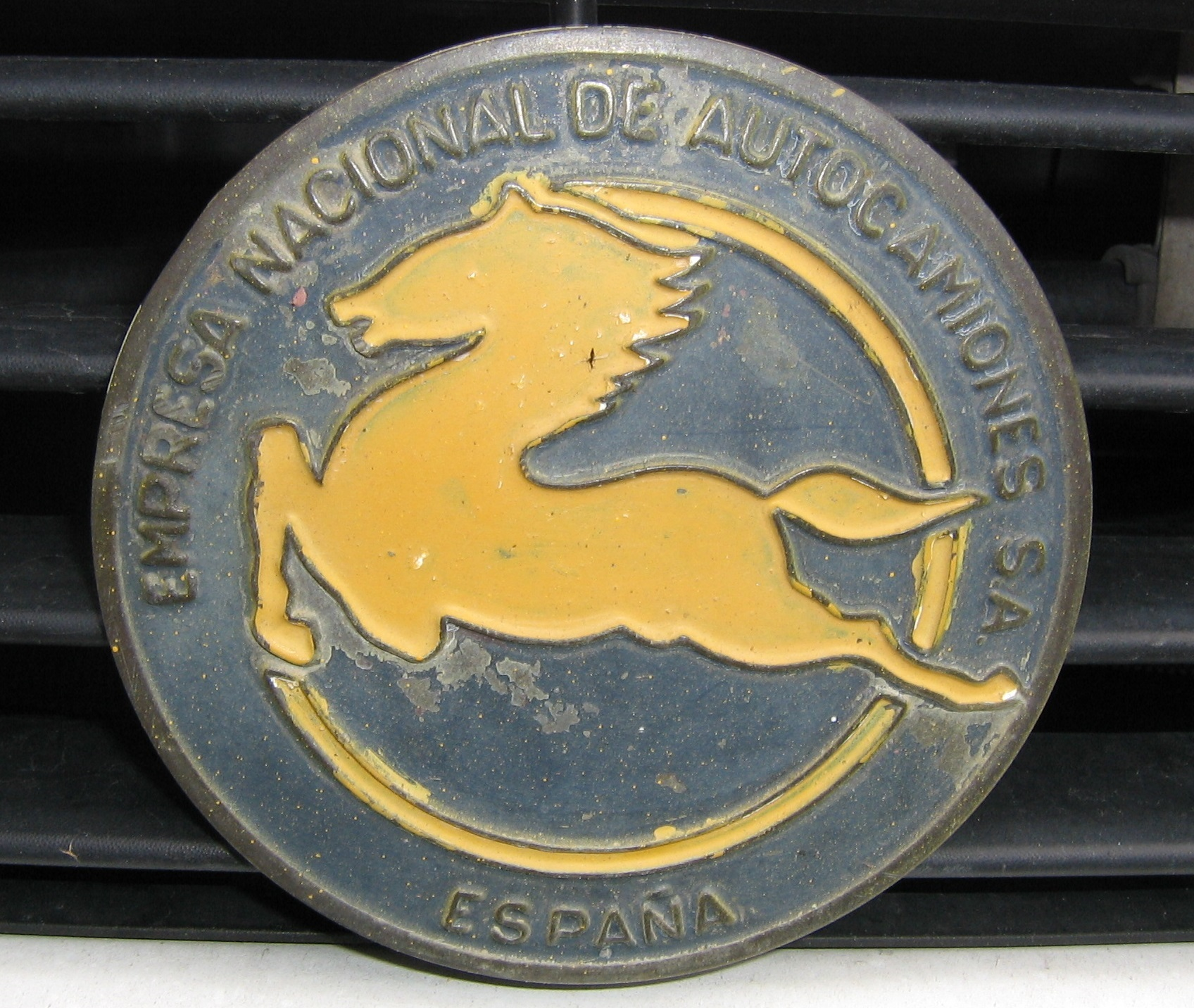
- Industry: Automobiles
- Founded: 1946
- Founder: Wifredo Ricart
- Defunct: 1994
- Headquarters: Barcelona, Spain
- Products: Trucks, buses, military vehicles

ENASA (Empresa Nacional de Autocamiones S.A.) was a Spanish motor vehicle manufacturing company that was incorporated in 1946 after having bought the automotive assets of the Spanish Hispano-Suiza and the Italian Fiat in Spain. It produced trucks, buses and military armored vehicles under the Pegaso and, for a short while, Sava marques. ENASA belonged to INI, a Spanish state-owned industrial holding company.

From 1983, ENASA also owned Seddon Atkinson, which it received from International Harvester as compensation for a planned engine plant which had failed to materialize. International Harvester pulled out as the market for truck engines was contracting at the time, while there were also problems with Spain's admittance to the European Economic Community (EEC). In 1990 Enasa was sold to Iveco.

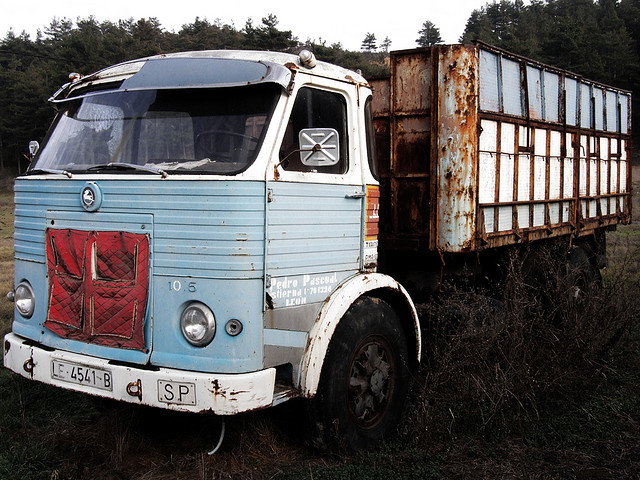
Enasa truck in Spain

== History of ENASA ==
=== Context ===
After the Spanish Civil War, the situation of the Spanish fleet of trucks was chaotic, most of which dated from before 1936. The most powerful and modern models had been requisitioned by the army which, at the end of the war, did not have them returned because they had been destroyed or were in a deplorable state. The national fleet of transport vehicles still running consisted of old models from the 1920s and 1930s, trucks mainly coming from foreign aid, including the Italian Fiat, OM, S.P.A and Lancia, or the Russian 3HC.

The new state that emerged in Spain after the civil war undertook a policy of autarkic industrialization, partly imposed by international sanctions, the principle of which was the substitution of imported manufactured products by national manufacturing.

After several attempts to create a national industry in this sector, the only company capable of facing the difficult economic situation and external isolation was Hispano-Suiza. Hispano-Suiza manufactured the 66G and 66D models, with gasoline and diesel engines, during the 1940s.

By the decree of February 10, 1940, the Ministry of Industry and Commerce of the government of General Franco had set the minimum production characteristics of future national manufacturers:

- For small cars with low consumption and low price, four seats and power less than 12 HP, 5,000 units. For passenger cars, five to seven seats and a power of approximately 25 HP, 9,000 units,
- For light trucks of two and a half to three and a half tons, vans and pickup trucks with a power of approximately 25 HP, 15,000 units,
- For heavy trucks, seven tons, with a diesel engine from 38 to 50 HP, 1,000 units per year.
- The same quantity of 1,000 units is set for tractors intended for agricultural or military use.

Given these general conditions of the automobile activity, initiatives in this sector had practically no other way than to present a project to the Ministry which, if it met the required production objectives, could obtain its classification in company of “national interest” and also advantages, such as the possibility of obtaining import licenses for equipment and materials to build the factory.

Thus, in the months following the publication of the decree, four potential projects were registered: Ford Motor Ibérica, Daimler-Benz, Fiat Hispania and Hispano-Suiza. Only two of these projects came to fruition and were the subject of negotiations led by senior officials who would be integrated into the INI in 1941: the FIAT project for passenger cars and that of Hispano-Suiza for trucks.

The first negotiation took place in March 1942 with FIAT Italy to set the conditions for its participation in a passenger car factory. In October 1942, negotiations began for the construction of an industrial vehicle factory with the Swiss manufacturer Saurer and, in December 1942, with the Italian manufacturers Alfa Romeo and Lancia.

At the end of October, the first draft of a contract with Saurer was available, in which their technical collaboration was envisaged to equip a factory with a capacity of 1,200 annual units with a diesel truck model of 5 tons of payload, without specifying the stages of the nationalization of production.

In November 1942, the Ministry approved the project presented by Lancia, to manufacture diesel trucks of the Alfa Romeo brand. The vehicles would be assembled in the Hispano-Suiza workshops in Barcelona, with, initially, a degree of nationalization equivalent to 68.9% of its value, with the aim of reaching 100% over the following five years.

The conditions imposed were not very encouraging for businesses, given the limited outlets in the Spanish national market. The only Spanish company able to engage in this production program, the private Catalan company Hispano-Suiza, requested the support of the INI to obtain immediate orders for military trucks.

Hispano Suiza's request was not surprising given the uncertainties associated with the project and the significant financial risks it entailed. The studies carried out by the INI on the problems posed by this industrialization objective confirm this. The weakness of the national industry in terms of raw materials and components required that a public company be involved in the field of heavy goods vehicles.

During the first half of 1943, intense negotiations took place with Hispano-Suiza and Alfa Romeo. The INI places this alliance with the Italian manufacturer at the forefront to the detriment of Saurer. In August 1943, the Presidency of the Government authorized the INI to immediately create a truck factory, but a month later, the project was stopped due to fears that the situation of the Italian company would change suddenly with the course that the war was taking and the political changes occurring in Italy.

With the abandonment of the “Italian” solution, there was an attempt at a “German” solution with Daimler Benz which never really got off the ground. The INI had to admit that the objective of launching the manufacture of trucks for the Spanish army in the short term was unachievable.

The negotiations between INI, Hispano-Suiza and Alfa Romeo made it possible to clarify everyone's positions and, in some way, foreshadowed the final solution obtained three years later.

The INI project had aroused the interest of Alfa Romeo and, in particular, the technical director of its sports car department, the Spaniard Wifredo Ricart. He made a direct proposal to the INI involving the existing industrial site of Hispano-Suiza, while waiting for a new factory to be built. The project did not differ much from the original Alfa Romeo project, except that the main player was the INI. W. Ricart's idea was clever because he proposed the manufacture of a vehicle adapted to the needs of the Spanish market, which corresponded perfectly to the autarkic and nationalist ideas of the INI, while considering that the Spanish engineer had proposed to guarantee its direct collaboration and that of its Italian collaborators, at a time when Spain was cruelly lacking in national engineers and technicians to undertake its industrial programs.

The breakdown of negotiations with Alfa Romeo led to the abandonment of W. Ricart's project, and made the use of Alfa Romeo technological bases impossible. It was on this occasion that the way of conducting negotiations with foreign manufacturers, desired by the INI, proved unviable.

Faced with the project being blocked, the military increased pressure to obtain the vehicles that had been promised to them a decade earlier. A new attempt at negotiation was initiated with Daimler-Benz, which remained without follow-up.

After the failure of negotiations with foreign manufacturers, only the Spanish national solution remained. The only Spanish truck manufacturer, Hispano-Suiza, manufactured in small series the 66G model, weighing 7 tonnes, equipped with a gasoline engine. The manufacturer was studying the prototype of the diesel version named “66 D13”.

Wifredo Ricart left Italy and returned to Spain at the end of 1945. He was hired by Juan Antonio Suanzes, then Minister of Industry and Commerce and Director of INI, to create the bases of the Spanish automobile industry. He will then relaunch his project to integrate Hispano-Suiza and Alfa Romeo technology, employing more than twenty Milanese engineers to design and manufacture the trucks that the country so badly needs. In March 1946, he developed a “Preliminary project for a factory for heavy industrial vehicles and diesel engines”. In April, the management of the INI submitted to the government the document "Manufacture of utility vehicles and diesel engines", as well as the draft decree and ministerial order approving the constitution of the new company by the INI.

The new company, once its creation was approved by the Council of Ministers by decree of May 1, 1946, was incorporated by notarial deed of October 23, 1946 under the name Empresa Nacional de Autocamiones, SA - ENASA. But before its creation, throughout 1946, tense negotiations took place between INI and Hispano-Suiza, which was forced to accept 25% of ENASA's shares as compensation for the assets in its La Sagrera factory in Barcelona.

This is how the first truck under the Pegaso brand was born, the Z-203, also called Pegaso I, which was only the 66G rebadged Pegaso. This truck was equipped with a 6-cylinder gasoline engine with a displacement of 5 liters.

== The company ENASA - Pegaso ==
=== Difficult beginnings ===
In a country subject to isolation following international sanctions, the supply of national raw materials, with a few rare, imported products, makes qualitative and quantitative monitoring almost impossible. Major production and, therefore, sales difficulties continued until the beginning of the 1960s. Steel supply problems constituted the most significant bottleneck in the company's productive activity, to which were added the notable difficulties in finding ferroalloys, aluminum and other light metals. The other penalizing factor was the lack of tires to the point of having to stop deliveries at the beginning of 1951.

Added to these material supply difficulties is that of electricity supply, because Catalonia, like all Spanish regions, has suffered the consequences of restrictions in electricity supply.

=== The cooperation agreement with Leyland Motors ===
In 1957, ENASA signed an agreement with the British manufacturer Leyland. The merger between the two companies had a double origin. Since its creation, ENASA has found itself in competition with Leyland in the urban bus market with the creation of Leyland Ibérica.

The signed agreement provides that Leyland Motors grants the manufacturing licenses for its 4 and 6 cylinder diesel engines to ENASA, takes a 30% stake in the capital of Pegaso and, in exchange, renounces exporting to Spain its vehicles in the range between five and ten tonnes, sector reserved for Pegaso with its new “Comet” range.

In the heavy vehicle sector, the collaboration initially focused on new models with 3 and 4 axles, of 12-14 and 16-18 tonnes, vehicles not produced in Spain. Its name Pegaso Z-211 and Z-212

=== The cooperation agreement with Viberti ===
During 1960, ENASA and the Italian body builder Viberti signed a cooperation agreement which allowed Pegaso to mount self-steering axles on its 4x2 straight trucks to make them 6x2s and to manufacture self-supporting bus bodies. Production of Pegaso Viberti Monotral buses and coaches, based on the license of the Italian manufacturer Viberti, began in 1961 and would provide a wide range of products for decades. The first will be the 6030-N bus, equipped with a horizontal floor, and which will achieve great commercial success.

=== The takeover of SAVA ===
In 1964, SAVA bought the majority of shares in Matacás, a major Spanish engine manufacturer.

In 1966, ENASA bought the struggling van manufacturer SAVA - Sociedad Anonima de Vehicules Automoviles and its Valladolid factory to expand its range with utility vehicles and above all to abort SAVA's attempt to build medium and heavy trucks which would have competed with Pegaso models.

With this acquisition, ENASA becomes the owner of the Matacás company and simply decides to close it.

SAVA had entered into cooperation agreements with the English manufacturer British Motor Corporation - BMC and with Berliet for the manufacture of a derivative of the GBH in a 6x2 version, called SAVA-Berliet GPS-12, produced in less than a hundred units and which will be abandoned in 1968. ENASA will not follow up on these agreements made with foreign manufacturers.

=== The agreement with International Harvester ===
At the end of the 1970s, the British manufacturer Leyland experienced serious financial difficulties and withdrew from ENASA. In 1980, ENASA found a new partner with the American manufacturer International Harvester with whom it wanted to develop a new range of heavy trucks. IH acquires 35% of ENASA. Shortly after, IH in turn faced a serious crisis in the United States and had to abandon its projects in Spain. IH compensated ENASA in 1983 by selling the British manufacturer Seddon Atkinson for a symbolic £1.

Finding itself alone again, in 1984, ENASA decided to join forces with the Dutch manufacturer DAF to study a new cabin for high-end models. For this purpose, they founded the joint company “Cabtec”.

=== The sale to IVECO ===
Spain entered the European Economic Community (EEC) in 1985 and the ENSA-Pegaso group had to face tough competition from European heavy goods vehicle manufacturers. The INI, still the owner of the group, is subject to European rules and must privatize industrial companies in the competitive sector. In 1989, INI launched a first international call for tenders to sell ENASA.

Following the refusal of the West German Cartel Office to allow the two competing German manufacturers MAN and Daimler-Benz to buy ENASA, notified in May 1990, the INI launched a second international call for tenders and sold the entire ENASA -Pegaso to IVECO on September 13, 1990. The manufacture of FIAT - IVECO models began immediately in the Spanish factories. The Barajas plant began production of the heavy-duty Iveco EuroTech and EuroStar models in 1992.

On July 12, 1994, the last Pegaso Troner truck left the assembly lines at the Barajas factory (Madrid). The last Pegaso engine was manufactured in 1995. The Iveco Defense Vehicles range of military trucks continued to be marketed in Spain under the Pegaso brand for a few years before resuming the IVECO badge.

== The main dates of the company ENASA - Pegaso ==
- 1946 - the first truck in a long series, the Pegaso I appears, a model based on the Hispano-Suiza 66G which, due to the shape of its cabin, was nicknamed "mofletes" (cheeks), because of the shape very rounded of its cabin which resembled cheeks,
- 1947 - Pegaso presents the Pegaso II Z-203, which is an evolution of the Pegaso I.
- 1949 - Pegaso presents the Z.701, the manufacturer's first tractor.
- 1951 - the Pegaso II received a diesel engine. Presentation of the Pegaso Z-102 car.
- 1953 - a prototype military truck, the M-3, is presented.
- 1954 - truck manufacturing is transferred to the Barajas factory near Madrid. The same year, production of the Z-207 Barajas began.
- 1955 - presentation of a prototype of the Z-210 with three axles, two of which are at the front, according to the Italian concept.
- 1961 - start of production of Pegaso Viberti Monotral buses and coaches, based on the license of the Italian manufacturer Viberti which will provide a wide range of products for decades. The first will be the 6030-N bus, equipped with a horizontal floor, and which will achieve great commercial success.
- 1963 - presentation of the first 4x4.
- 1964 - birth of the "Comet" series. The manufacture of 3 and 4 axle trucks, as in Italy, begins.
- 1966 - the range extends downwards, start of van manufacturing. ENASA took control of the Spanish manufacturer SAVA (Sociedad Anonima Vehiculos Automoviles) and absorbed it in 1968,
- 1975 - the heavy range is equipped with the first tilting cabins.
- 1977 - at the request of the military authorities, production of armored vehicles (BMR).
- 1983 - the T-1 is introduced to the market. ENASA-Pegaso buys the British manufacturer Seddon Atkinson from International Harvester for a symbolic £1 and moves closer to "DAF",
- 1987 - presentation of the Troner, the result of a collaboration with DAF and Seddon Atkinson.
- 1990 - Following the refusal of the West German Cartel Office to allow competing German manufacturers MAN and Daimler-Benz to buy ENASA notified in May 1990, INI sold the ENASA-Pegaso assembly to IVECO in September 1990 at the following a second international call for tenders. The manufacture of FIAT - IVECO models begins immediately in the Spanish factories. The Barajas factory began production of Iveco EuroTech and EuroStar in 1992.
- 1994 - July 12, the last Pegaso Troner truck left the assembly lines of the Barajas factory (Madrid). The last Pegaso engine was manufactured in 1995. The Iveco Defense Vehicles range of military trucks continued to be marketed in Spain under the Pegaso brand for a few years.

Since 1990 ENASA has been part of the Italian IVECO group, a subsidiary of the FIAT group.

== See also ==
- Instituto Nacional de Industria
- Pegaso

== Bibliography ==
- All the information was taken from the 25 pages of the document(s) Martínez Sevilla Miguel Ángel, La Empresa Nacional de Autocamiones, SA, (1946-1975)Centro Histórico Pegaso.
- Martínez Sevilla, Miguel Ángel, La Empresa Nacional de Autocamiones, S.A., 1946-1975 (PDF) (in Spanish), Centro Histórico Pegaso, archived from the original (PDF) on 2007-01-12
