= Motor Traction =

Motor Traction Limited manufactured Rutland motor lorries at Rutland Works, Vulcan Way, New Addington, England. The lorries, capacities between 3 tons and 15 tons, and passenger chassis were built to an operator's specific requirements using the major components of other manufacturers. They first exhibited at the 1956 Commercial Motor Show.

The business operated from 1951 to 1958, at first from Croydon. An earlier name for the business was Waggon Rutland Limited. Vehicles were often marked MTN.

The shareholders chose to liquidate the company in 1958.
