= SEAT Ibiza =

Compact car by SEAT

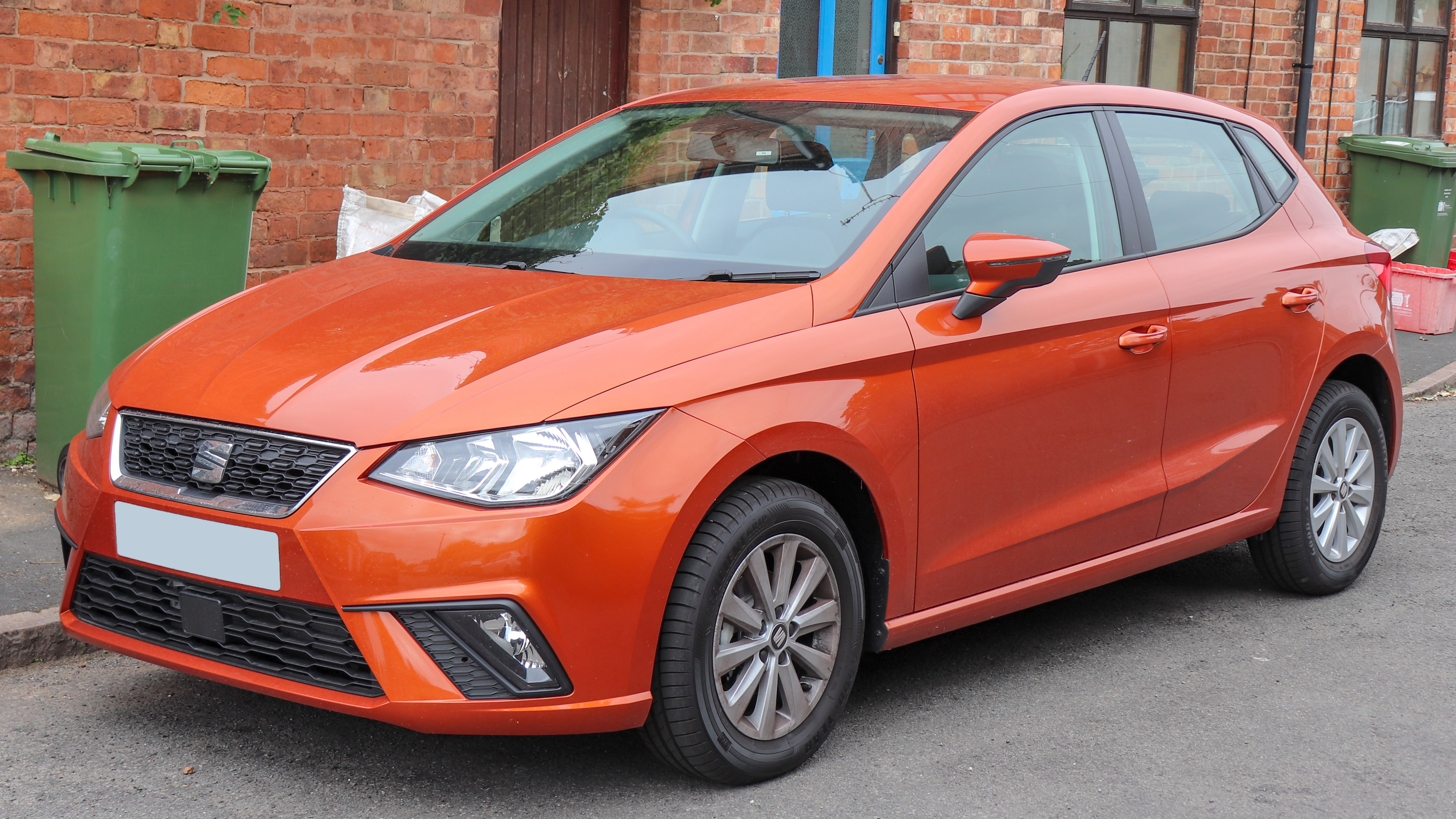

Overview
- Manufacturer: SEAT
- Production: 1984–present

Body and chassis
- Class: Supermini (B), ST version: Saloon
- Layout: Front-engine, front-wheel-drive

Chronology
- Predecessor: SEAT Fura
- Successor: SEAT León ( i think )

The SEAT Ibiza is a supermini car that has been manufactured by Spanish auto manufacturer SEAT since 1984. It is SEAT's best-selling car. The Ibiza is named after the Spanish island of Ibiza and was the second SEAT model to be named after a Spanish location, after the SEAT Málaga. It was introduced at the 1984 Paris Motor Show as the first car developed by SEAT as an independent company, although it was designed by SEAT in collaboration with well-known firms including Italdesign, Karmann, and Porsche.

From the second-generation version onwards, SEAT formed part of the German automotive industry concern Volkswagen Group. All subsequent Ibiza generations, and the rest of the SEAT model range, incorporated Volkswagen Group platforms, parts, and technologies.

The Ibiza spans five generations, among which it has debuted twice (in its second and in its fourth generations) a new platform of the Volkswagen Group. All of them were the top-selling model in SEAT's product line.

The Ibiza is now available only in five-door hatchback variants; between 1993 and 2008, saloon, coupé, and estate versions were sold as the SEAT Córdoba. In 2010, an estate version, dubbed the Ibiza ST, was launched.

== First generation (021A; 1984) ==
SEAT Ibiza Mk1
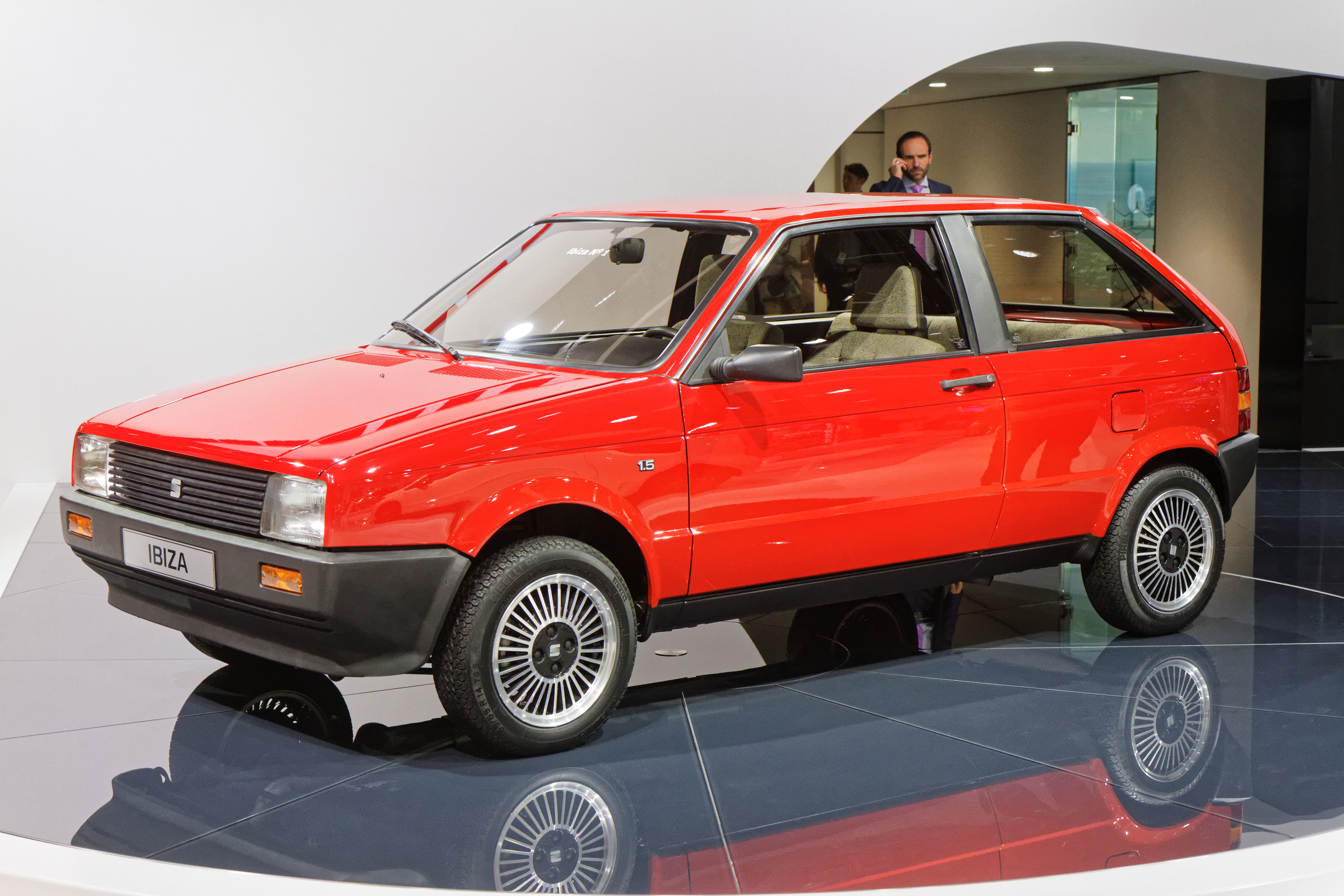
- SEAT Ibiza Mk1 (pre-facelift)

Overview
- Model code: 021A
- Production: 1984–1993; 1999–2008 (China)
- Assembly: Spain: Barcelona
- Designer: Giorgetto Giugiaro at Italdesign

Body and chassis
- Body style: 3- and 5-door hatchback
- Related: Fiat Ritmo; SEAT Ronda; SEAT Málaga; Nanjing Yuejin Soyat

Powertrain
- Engine: 903 cc I4; 1193 cc I4; 1461 cc I4; 1461 cc turbo I4; 1675 cc I4; 1714 cc diesel I4
- Transmission: 4/5 Speed manual 3 Speed automatic

Dimensions
- Wheelbase: 2,443 mm (96.2 in)
- Length: 3,683 mm (145.0 in)
- Width: 1,610 mm (63.4 in)
- Height: 1,395 mm (54.9 in)

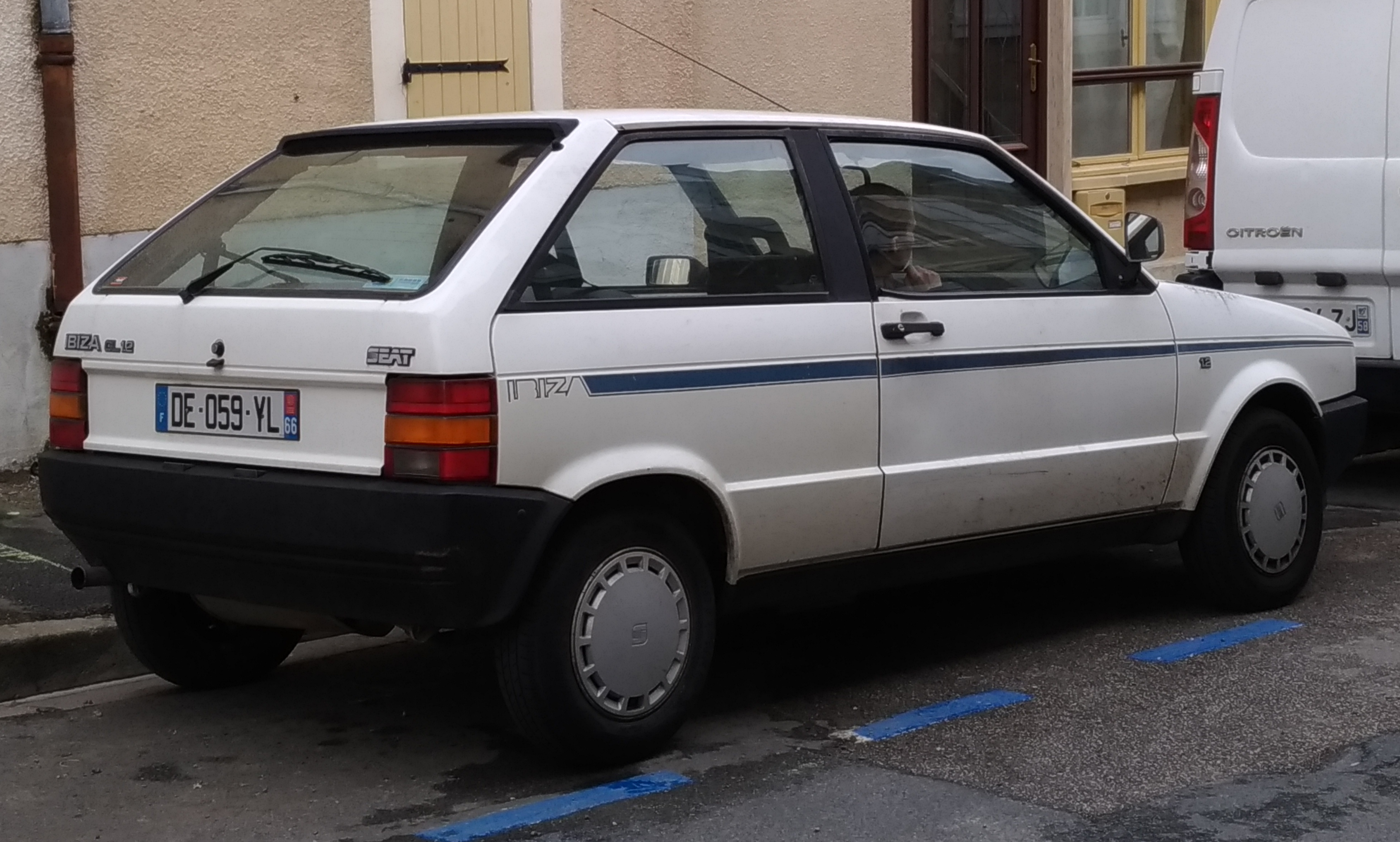
SEAT Ibiza Mk1 (pre-facelift)

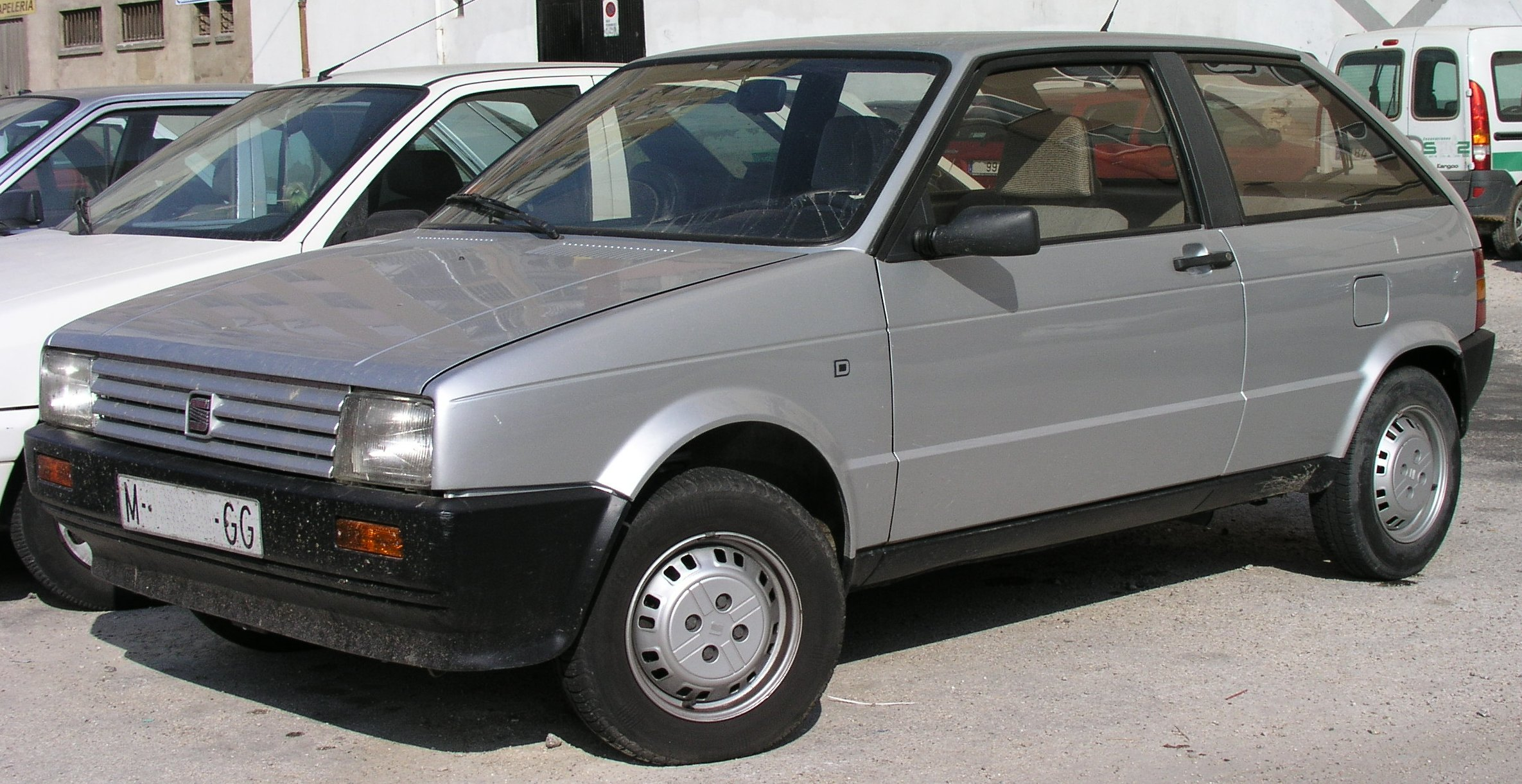
SEAT Ibiza Mk1 facelift model

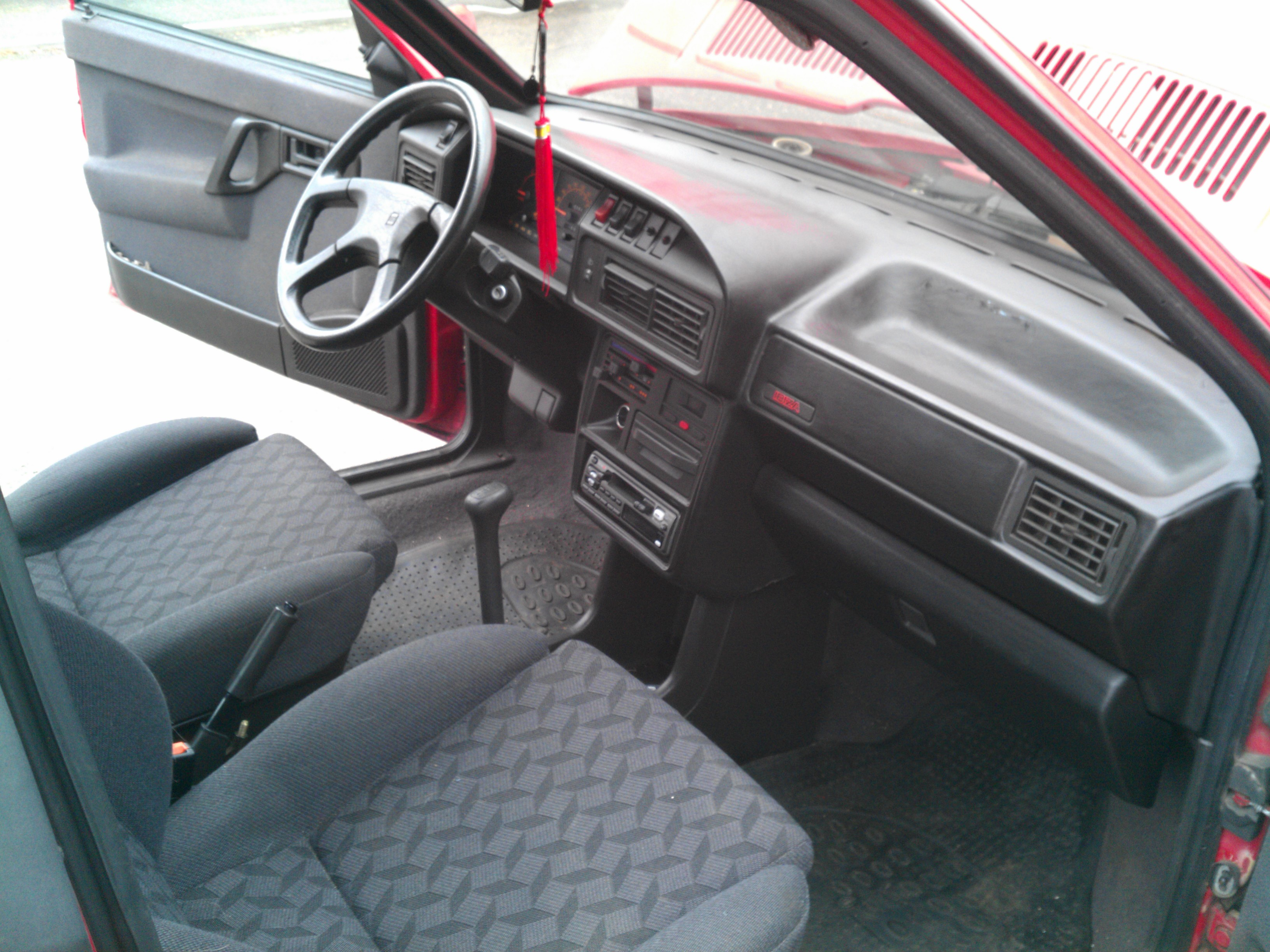
SEAT Ibiza Mk1 interior

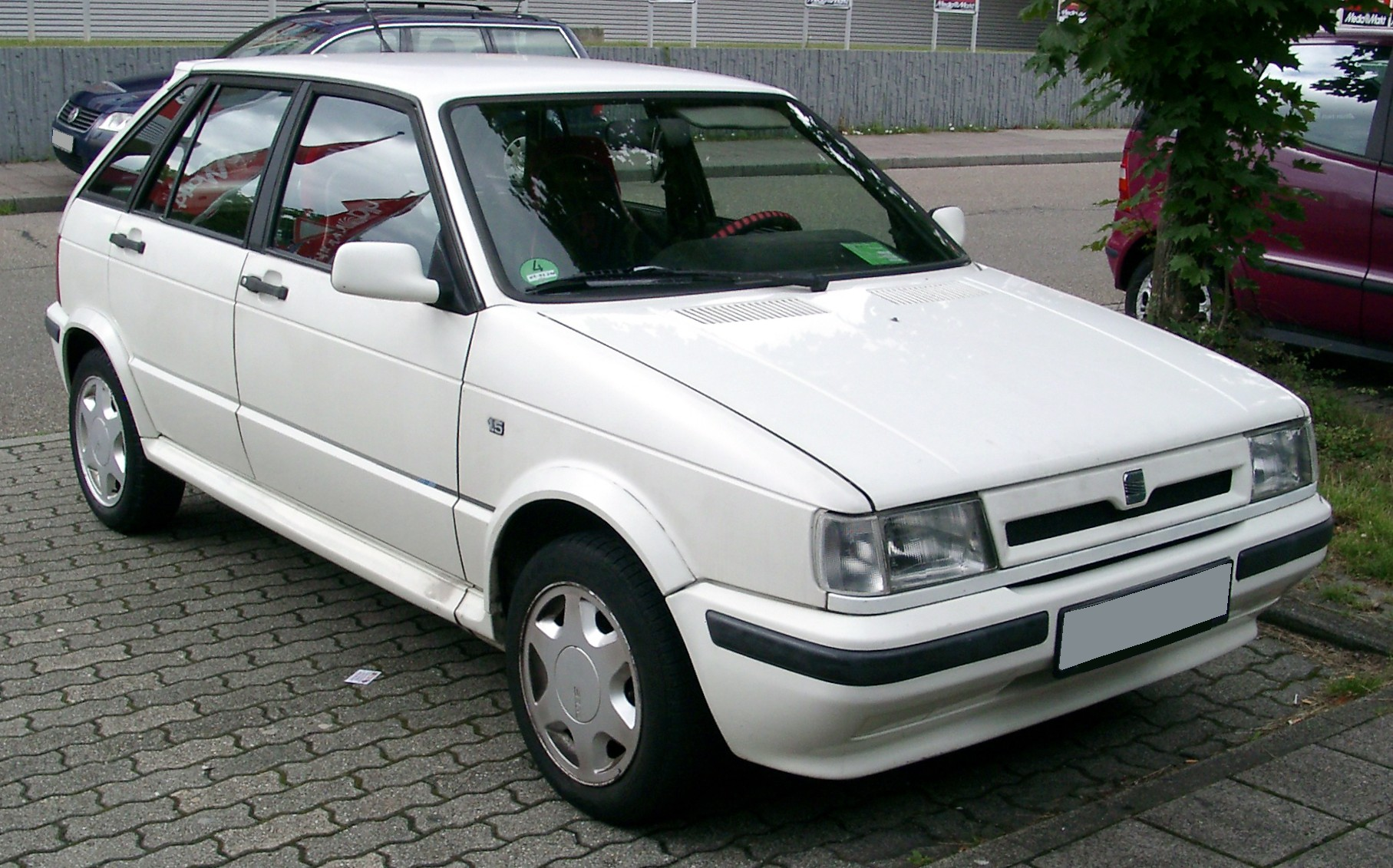
SEAT Ibiza New Style (1991-1993)

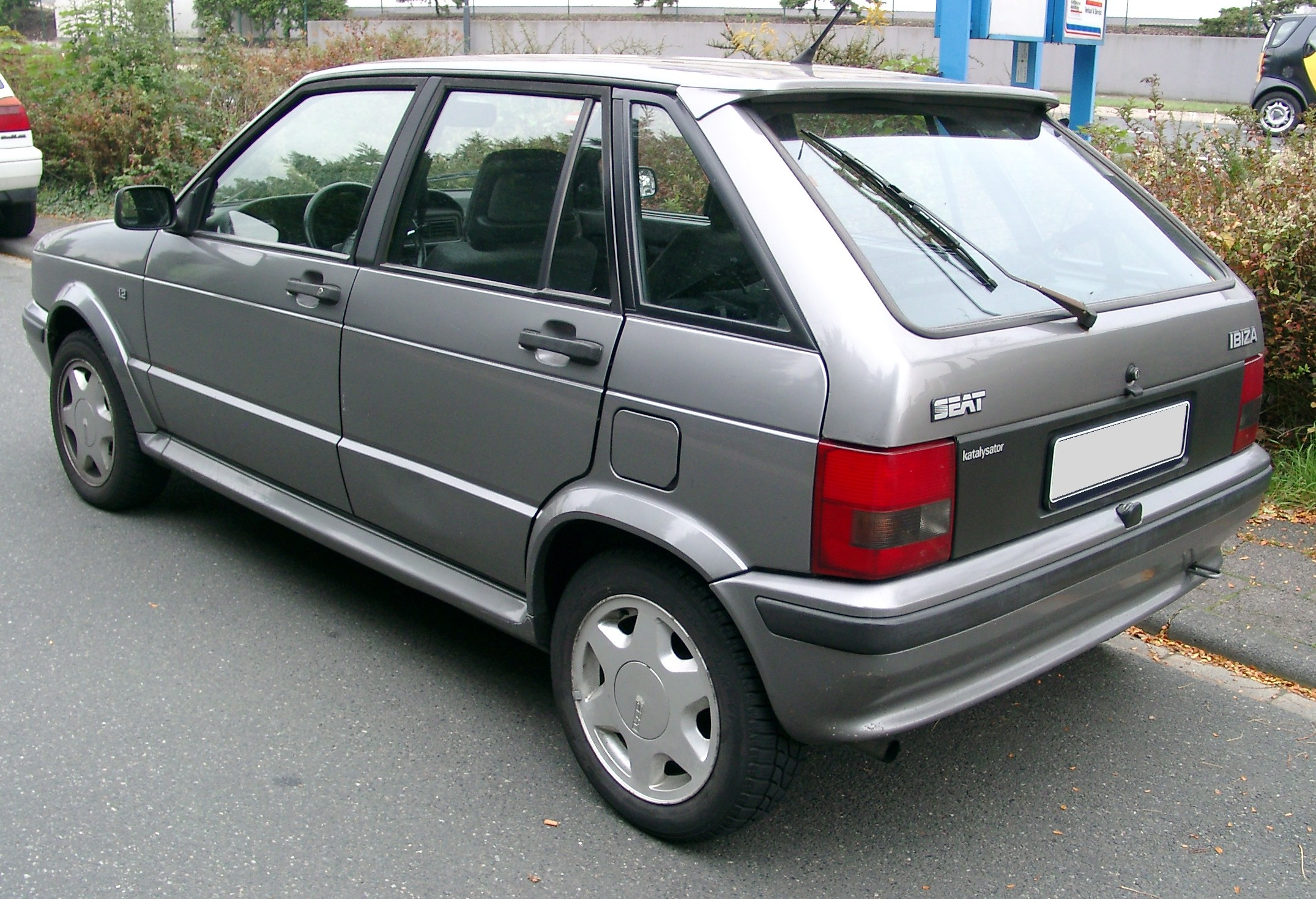
SEAT Ibiza New Style, rear view

Introduced at the 1984 Paris Motor Show, the SEAT Ibiza Mk1 (codenamed 021A) entered production on the 'Zona Franca' assembly lines on 27 April 1984, where it proved to be a success for the Spanish manufacturer, as it sold 1,342,001 units prior to the launch of the second-generation Ibiza in 1993. The Ibiza's sales success gave the SEAT marque a platform to build on, as it looked to increase sales in following years.

This version, while it established the now classic Ibiza shape, was advertised as having "Italian styling and German engines": its bodywork was designed by Giorgetto Giugiaro's Italdesign, and it was prepared for industrialisation by the German manufacturer Karmann. It was based on the SEAT Ronda, a small family car, which in turn was based on the Fiat Ritmo. The gearbox and powertrain were developed in collaboration with Porsche, thus named under licence System Porsche. Despite Porsche's direct involvement in the Ibiza's engines, it was only after paying a royalty of seven German marks per car sold back to Porsche that SEAT gained the right to put the 'System Porsche' inscription on the engine blocks.

By the time Giugiaro was assigned to the Ibiza project, his previous proposal for the second generation of the Volkswagen Golf had been rejected by Volkswagen. So when SEAT approached him with the proposal for a spacious supermini-class contender, that particular project was reincarnated as the first generation of the SEAT Ibiza.

Using a compact car as a basis, it was larger than most superminis such as the Ford Fiesta and Opel Corsa/Vauxhall Nova, but smaller than small family cars, such as the Ford Escort and Opel Kadett/Vauxhall Astra. The luggage capacity started from 320 litres, or 1,200 litres after folding the rear seats.

It was launched in the United Kingdom market in September 1985, along with the Málaga saloon. It largely competed with budget offerings like the Hyundai Pony, and gave budget buyers a more modern alternative to the outdated offerings from Lada, Škoda, Yugo, and FSO. After a slow start, sales picked up and reached the 10,000-per-year milestone by the end of the decade.

The interior space was rather respectable for what it was, but the styling was considered unimaginative, even though it was known for having a rather quirky interior instrument layout, marked by a lack of control stalks. The indicators were operated by a rocker-switch, and the headlights by a sliding switch. It had three principal trim levels (L, GL, and GLX) with body styles of 3 and 5 doors and several versions including Base, Special, Disco, Chrono, Designer, Fashion, and SXi. As power outputs dropped due to more stringent emissions requirements, a 1.7-litre version of the engine was developed for the Sportline version. For the same reason, a 109 PS (80 kW) turbocharged version of the 1.5-litre engine was developed for the Swiss market and presented in March 1989.

In the meantime, SEAT had already signed a cooperation agreement with Volkswagen (1982), and in 1986, the German car maker became SEAT's major shareholder. The Ibiza Mark 1 received a very light restyling in early 1989 with a moderate exterior face lift, an entirely new, less radical interior, and many mechanical modifications. This is referred to as the second series, although it can be hard to distinguish from the original. Most obvious is the shift from a black plastic grille with seven bars to one with four body-coloured ones, with some models receiving new side moldings. The interior was all new, with new seats and a new steering wheel, while the gearbox was thoroughly redesigned, and the brakes and steering improved. At the time, the Ibiza was being produced at a rate of 1,100 cars per day, and the cumulative production had reached a half million.

A more thorough restyling was launched in 1991 under the name New Style, although by now, an all-new Ibiza was being developed.

The following year, in February 1992, SEAT launched the Ibiza "Serie Olímpica" to celebrate SEAT's participation in the 1992 Olympic Games in Barcelona as a sponsor, and the SEAT Ibiza Mk1, along with the SEAT Toledo Mk1, became the official cars of the Games.

=== Engine specifications ===
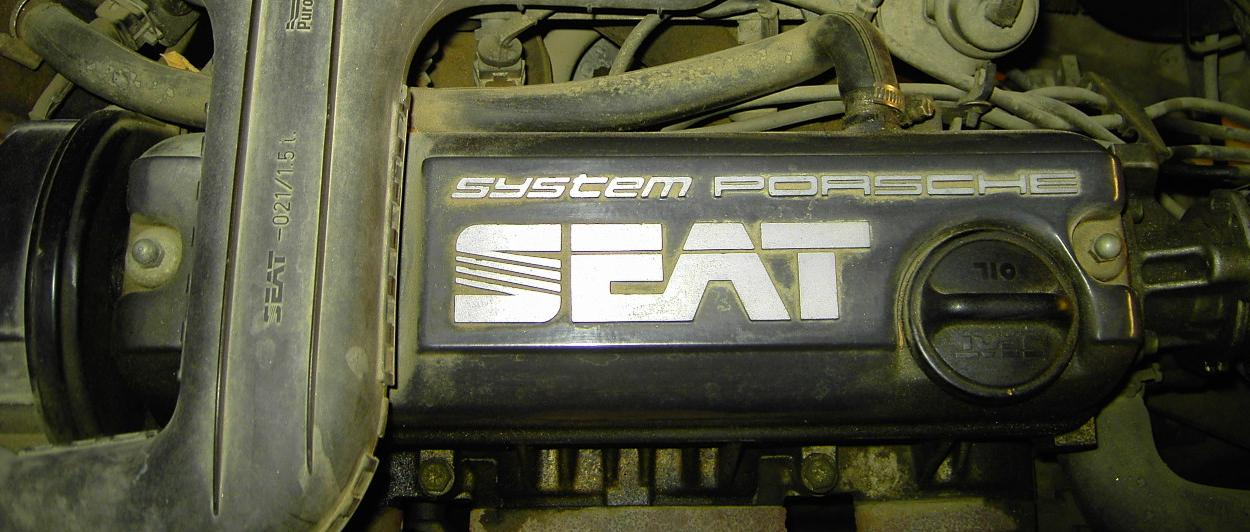
SEAT Ibiza Mk1 1.5-litre engine bearing the System Porsche inscription

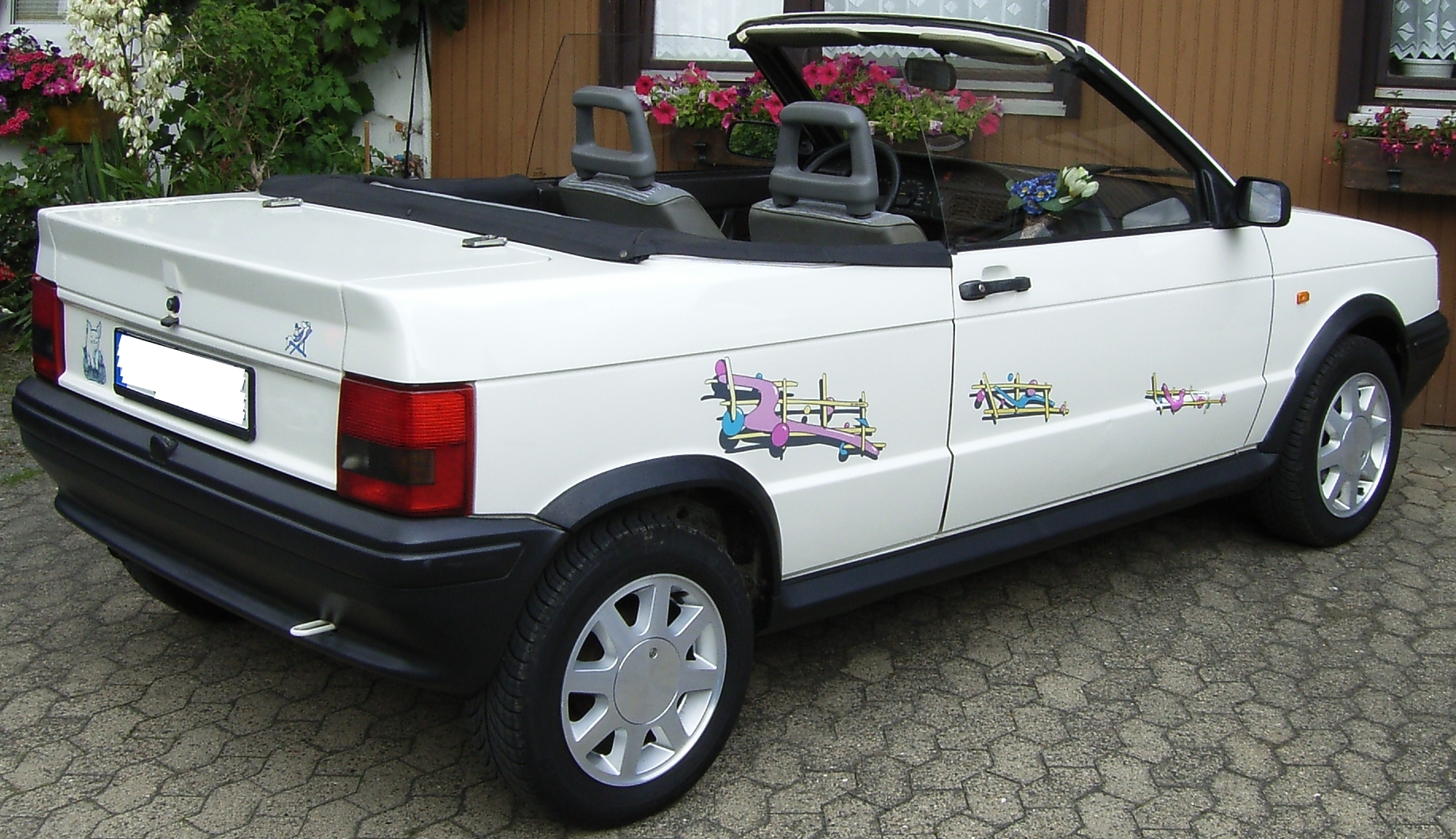
SEAT Ibiza Mk1 cabriolet derivative produced by Bieber Cabrio Borken

All engines were inline-four cylinder units, front transverse mounted: The 0.9-litre and 1.2-litre engines had carburetors, as did the 1.5-litre 85 hp engine, while the 1.5-litre 90 hp and 1.7-litre engines, introduced in 1989, used single-point injection systems. The 1.5-litre 100 hp, introduced in 1988, had multi-point fuel injection. The 1.7-litre diesel was an indirect injection unit.

Type	Engine code	Make	Displacement	Fuel type	Catalytic converter	Max. power	Max. torque	Bore×stroke	Indicated maximum speed
Petrol engines
0.9 8V	146A.000	Fiat	903 cc	carburetor (WEBER 32 ICEV)	since 1989	46 PS (34 kW; 45 hp)	56 N⋅m (41 lb⋅ft)	65.0×68.0 mm	130 km/h (81 mph)
1.2 8V	021A1.000	Seat + Porsche	1,193 cc	carburetor (Pierburg 1 B 3)	no	63 PS (46 kW; 62 hp)	86 N⋅m (63 lb⋅ft)	75.0×67.5 mm	155 km/h (96 mph)
1.2 8V	021C1.000	Seat + Porsche	1,193 cc	injection (BOSCH LU2 - Jetronic)	yes	71 PS (52 kW; 70 hp)	96 N⋅m (71 lb⋅ft)	75.0×67.5 mm	157 km/h (98 mph)
1.5 8V	021A2.000	Seat + Porsche	1,461 cc	carburetor (Bressel-Weber 32 DSTA 151)	no	86 PS (63 kW; 85 hp)	116 N⋅m (86 lb⋅ft)	83.0×67.5 mm	175 km/h (108 mp/h)
1.5 8V	021C2.000	Seat + Porsche	1,461 cc	injection (BOSCH LU2 - Jetronic)	yes	90 PS (66 kW; 89 hp)	120 N⋅m (89 lb⋅ft)	83.0×67.5 mm	175 km/h (108 mp/h)
1.5 8V	021B2.000	Seat + Porsche	1,461 cc	injection (BOSCH LE2 - Jetronic)	no	100 PS (74 kW; 99 hp)	128 N⋅m (94 lb⋅ft)	83.0×67.5 mm	184 km/h (114 mp/h)
1.5 8V Turbo	–	Seat + Porsche	1,461 cc	–	–	109 PS (80 kW; 108 hp)	–	83.0×67.5 mm	–
1.7 8V	021A3.000	Seat + Porsche	1,675 cc	injection (BOSCH LU2 - Jetronic)	–	98 PS (72 kW; 97 hp)	–	83.0×77.4 mm	–
1.7 8V	021B3.000	Seat + Porsche	1,675 cc	injection (BOSCH LU2 - Jetronic)	yes	100 PS (74 kW; 99 hp)	138 N⋅m (102 lb⋅ft)	83.0×77.4 mm	182 km/h (113 mp/h)
1.7 8V	021C3.000	Seat + Porsche	1,675 cc	injection (BOSCH LU2 - Jetronic)	–	108 PS (79 kW; 107 hp)	–	83.0×77.4 mm	–
Diesel engines
1.7 D	022A5.000	Fiat	1,714 cc	injection (BOSCH CZ-B.494 263)	no	56 PS (41 kW; 55 hp)	98 N⋅m (72 lb⋅ft)	83.0×79.2 mm	150 km/h (93 mp/h)
1.7 D	138A5.000	Fiat	1,714 cc	injection (BOSCH CZ-B.494 263)	no	56 PS (41 kW; 55 hp)	98 N⋅m (72 lb⋅ft)	83.0×79.2 mm	150 km/h (93 mp/h)

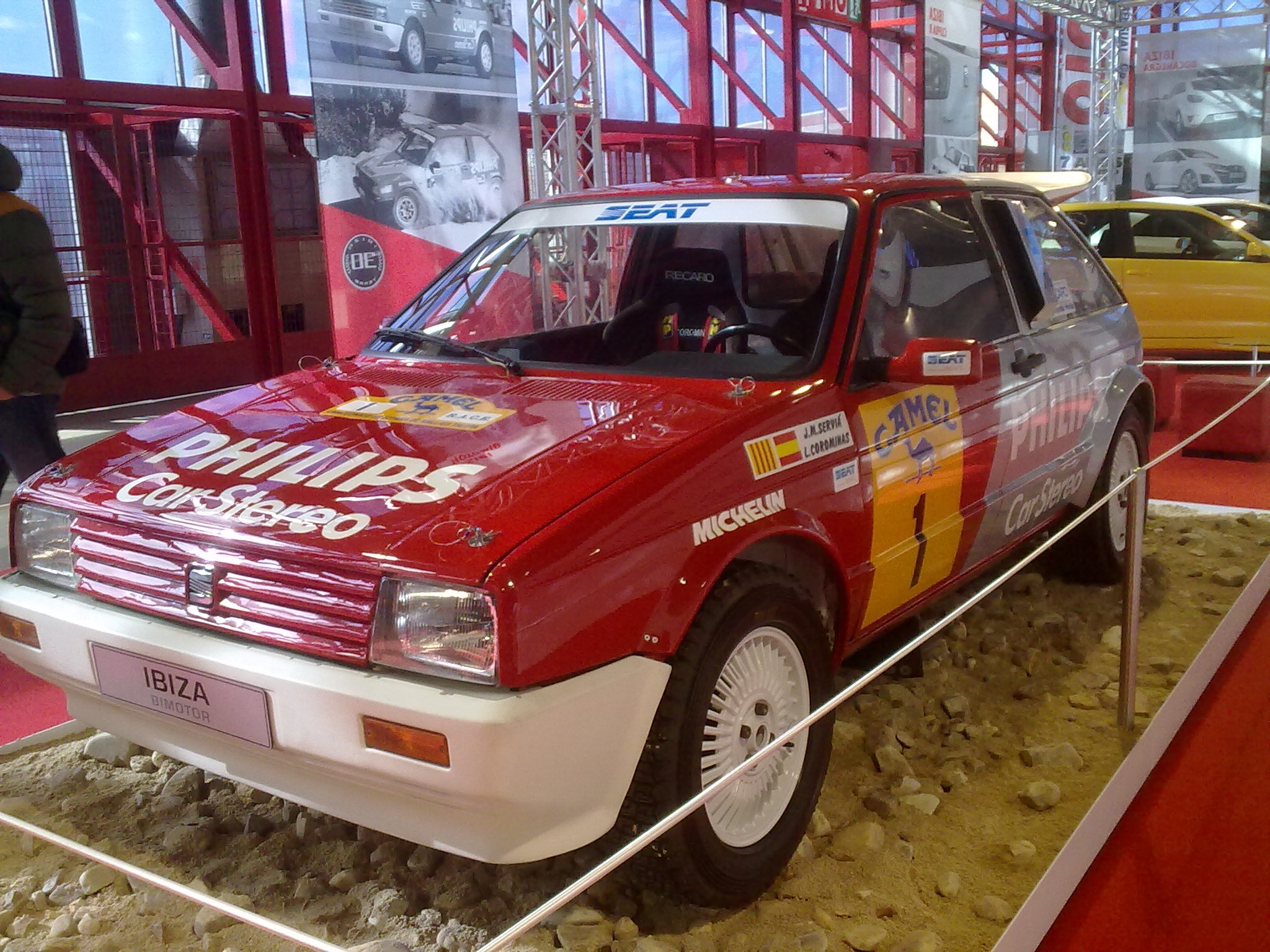
SEAT Ibiza Bimotor, a twin-engine, all-wheel-drive rally car

=== Motorsport ===
The SEAT Ibiza Mk1 took part in several rally events and formed the basis on which the Campeonato SEAT Ibiza de Rallies was organised by the SEAT Sport division in 1985, however, its most notable rally version has been the all-wheel-drive Ibiza Bimotor, manufactured in 1986 and equipped with two engines, each delivering power to one axle.

=== Rebadges ===
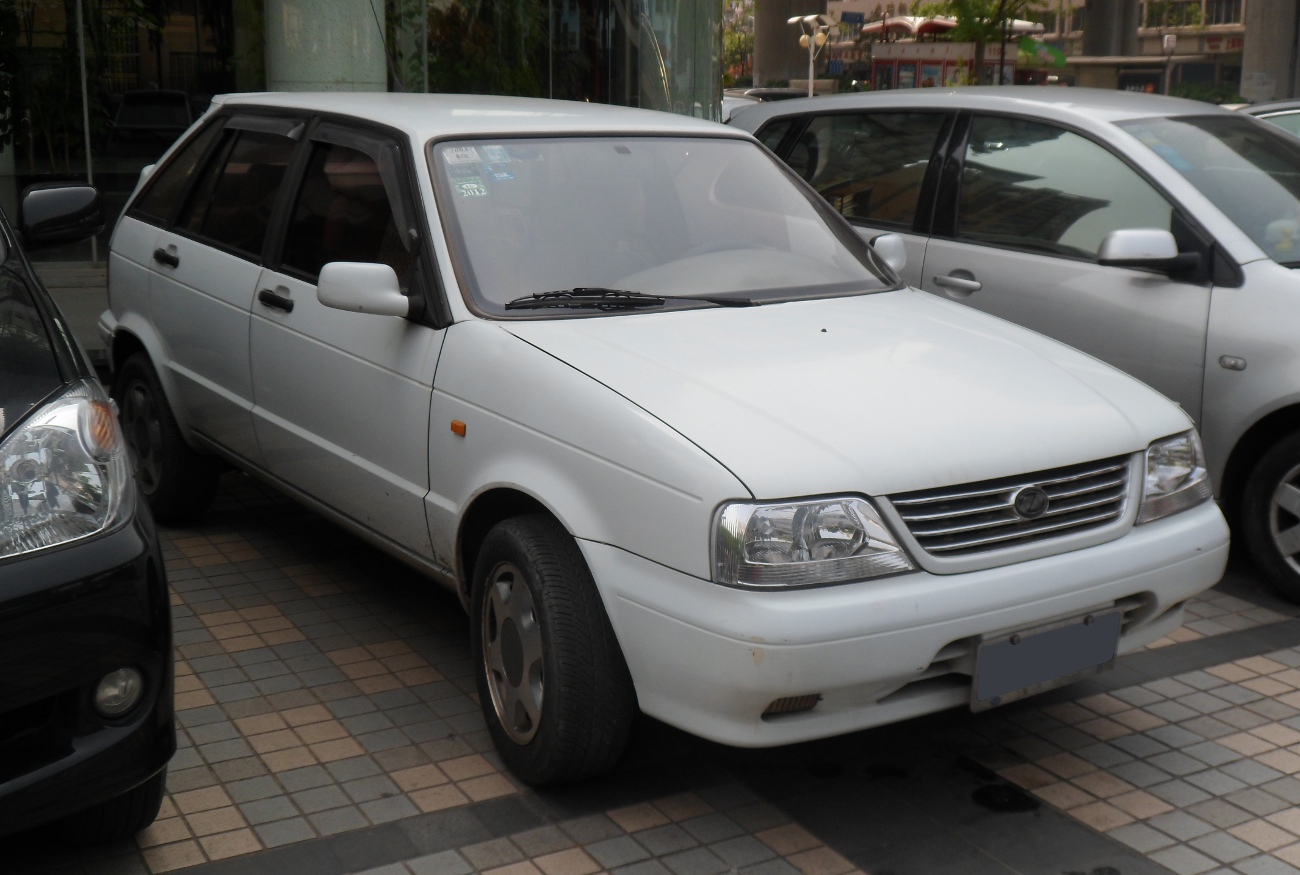
Nanjing Yuejin Soyat, a rebadged SEAT Ibiza Mk1 for the Chinese market

In 1997, the Ibiza Mk1 design license was bought by a joint venture between Chinese automaker Nanjing Automobile Group and Malaysia's Lion Group. In June 1999, it entered production as the Eagle, and was redeveloped and rebadged into the Nanjing Yuejin Soyat in late 2003. Chinese Ibiza production came to a final end in 2008, after another facelift in 2007.

=== Derivatives ===
The Spanish company Emelba produced two derivatives of the SEAT Ibiza Mk1: a pickup truck version, and the Emelba Siete, a 7-seat MPV derivative.

In addition to the Emelba variants, further Ibiza Mk1 derivative models have been produced from several companies, including the Anibal Raider and Podadera models.

=== Concept cars ===
SEAT also built a cabriolet version of the SEAT Ibiza Mk1, the Ibiza Cabrio, but it did not enter production.

== Second generation (6K; 1993) ==
SEAT Ibiza Mk2
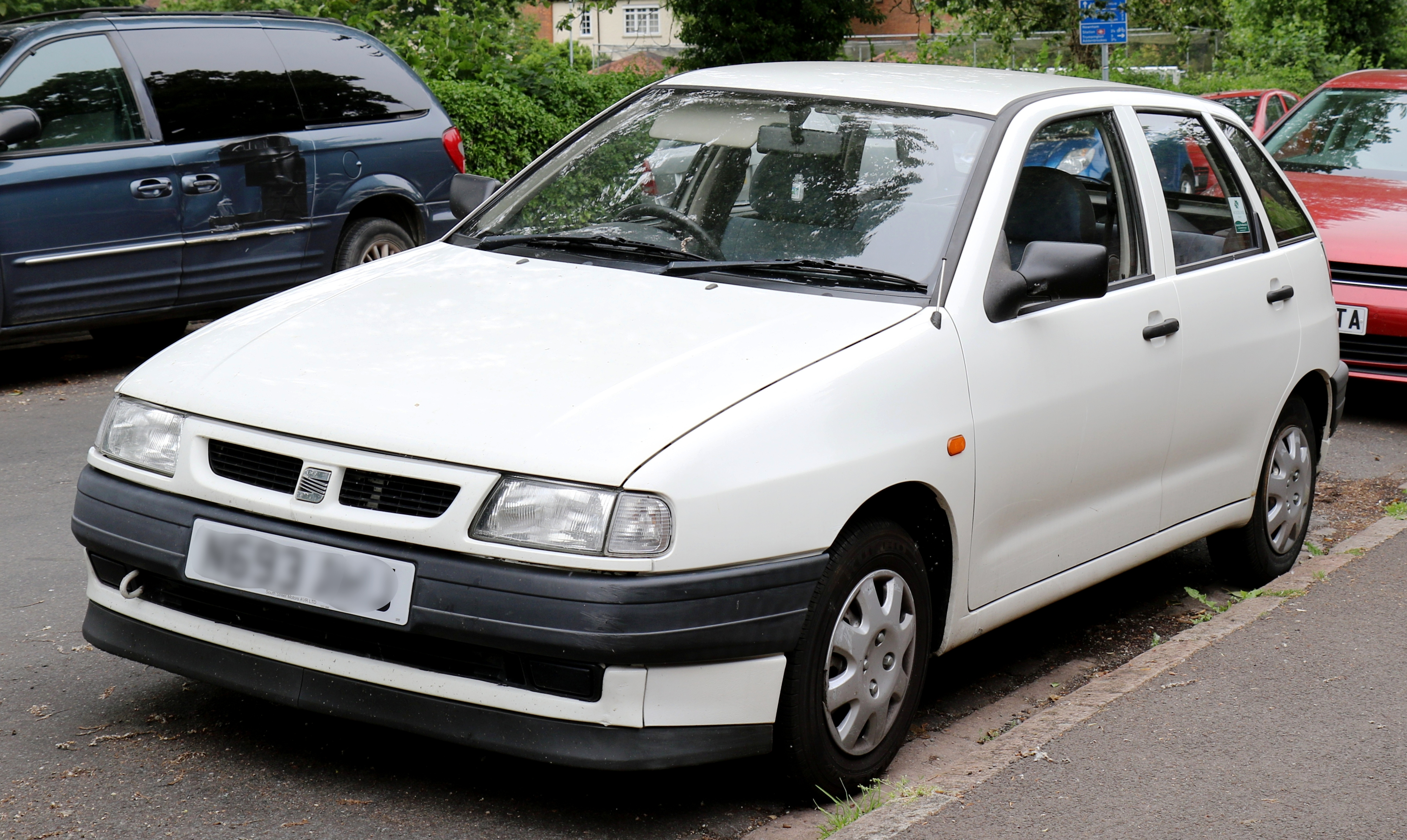
- 1995 SEAT Ibiza Mk2 pre-facelift

Overview
- Model code: 6K
- Also called: Volkswagen Polo Playa (South Africa); SEAT Barcelona (Taiwan)
- Production: 1993–2002
- Assembly: Spain: Martorell, Catalonia; Brazil: Ipiranga (1996 only)
- Designer: Giorgetto Giugiaro at Italdesign

Body and chassis
- Body style: 3 and 5-door hatchback
- Platform: Volkswagen Group A03/A3
- Related: SEAT Córdoba Mk1; SEAT Inca; Volkswagen Polo Mk3; Volkswagen Caddy

Powertrain
- Engine: Petrol engines: 1.0 L I4 8v 1.0 L I4 16v 1.05 L I4; 1.3 L I4; 1.4 L I4 8v 1.4 L I4 16v 1.6 L I4; 1.8 L I4 8v 1.8 L I4 16v 1.8 L I4 20v Turbo; 2.0 L I4 8v 2.0 L I4 16v Diesel engines: 1.9 L I4 D/SDI; 1.9 L I4 TD/TDI
- Transmission: 5 Speed manual 4 Speed automatic

Dimensions
- Wheelbase: 2,443 mm (96.2 in)
- Length: 3,853 mm (151.7 in)
- Width: 1,640 mm (64.6 in)
- Height: 1,422 mm (56.0 in)

The Ibiza Mk2 (Typ 6K) was the first Ibiza generation fully developed and produced under Volkswagen Group ownership. Its platform variant was based on the Volkswagen Polo 6N and Volkswagen Golf Mk3. In the interior, the pre-facelift Ibiza 6K shared its dashboard with many other models from SEAT and Volkswagen, such as the SEAT Córdoba Mk1, the Volkswagen Polo Classic, the SEAT Inca, the Volkswagen Polo Mk3, and others.

This Ibiza was available in three- and five-door models; the saloon/coupé variant was known as the SEAT Córdoba, and the estate was known as the SEAT Córdoba Vario. The Ibiza was regularly the best-selling car in Spain and sold relatively well in the rest of Europe, helping SEAT increase its sales figures significantly from 1993 onwards.

Before the facelift, the trim levels were i, CL, CLX, GLX, Pasion, S, and GTI.

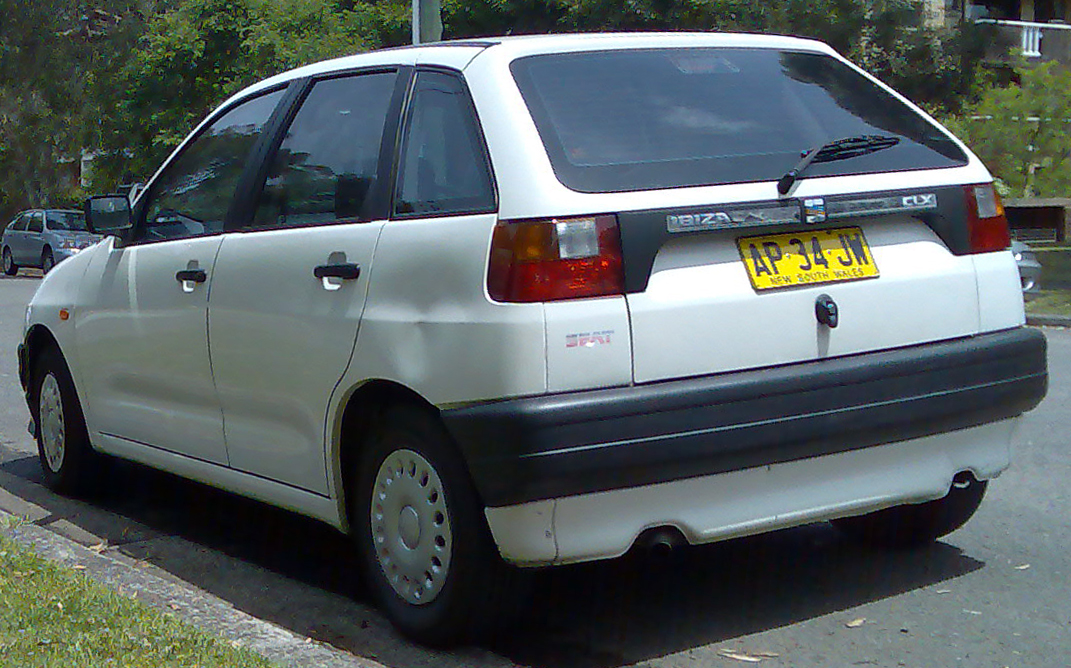
1995 SEAT Ibiza Mk2 pre-facelift rear

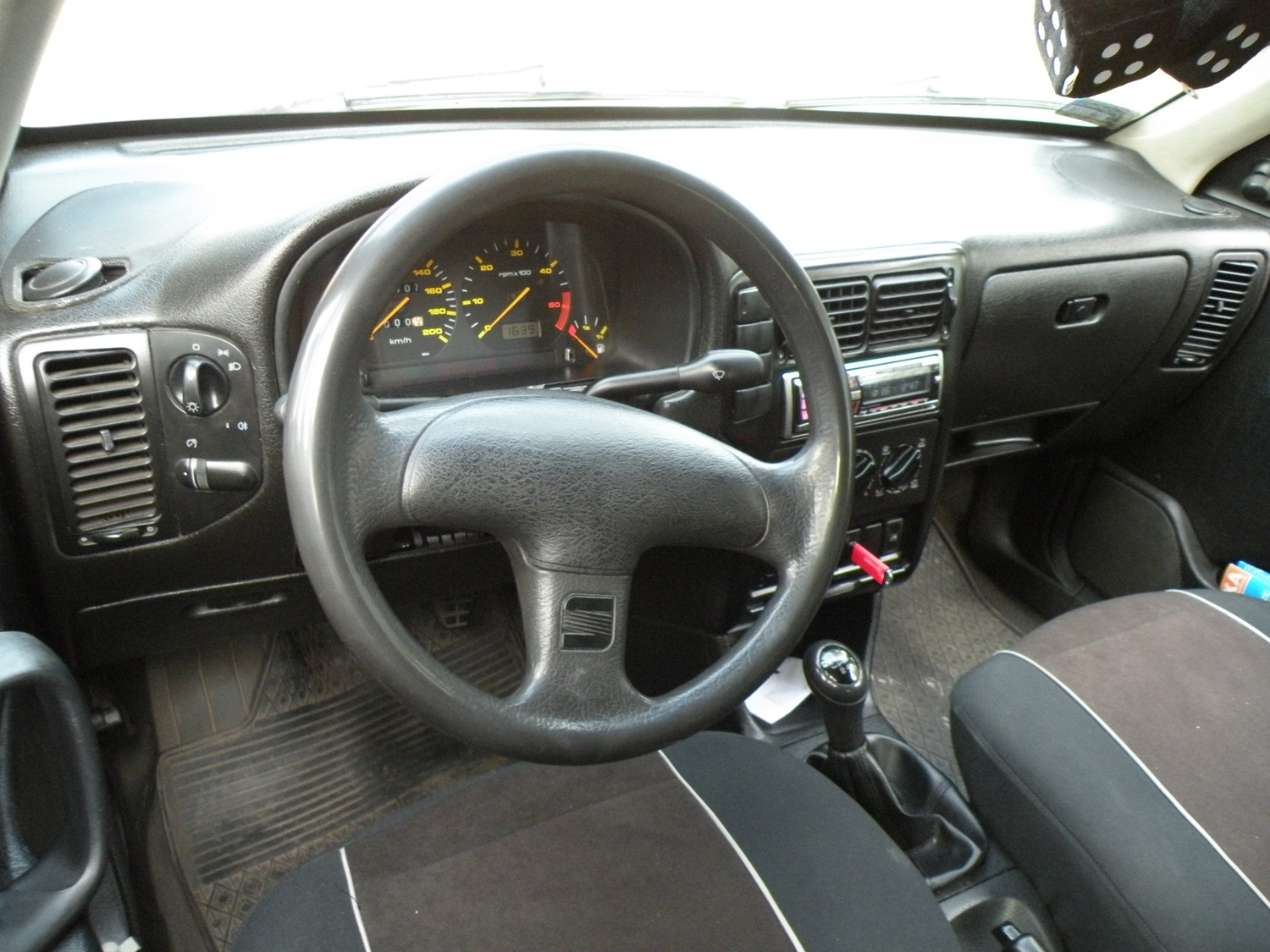
SEAT Ibiza Mk2 pre-facelift interior without airbags

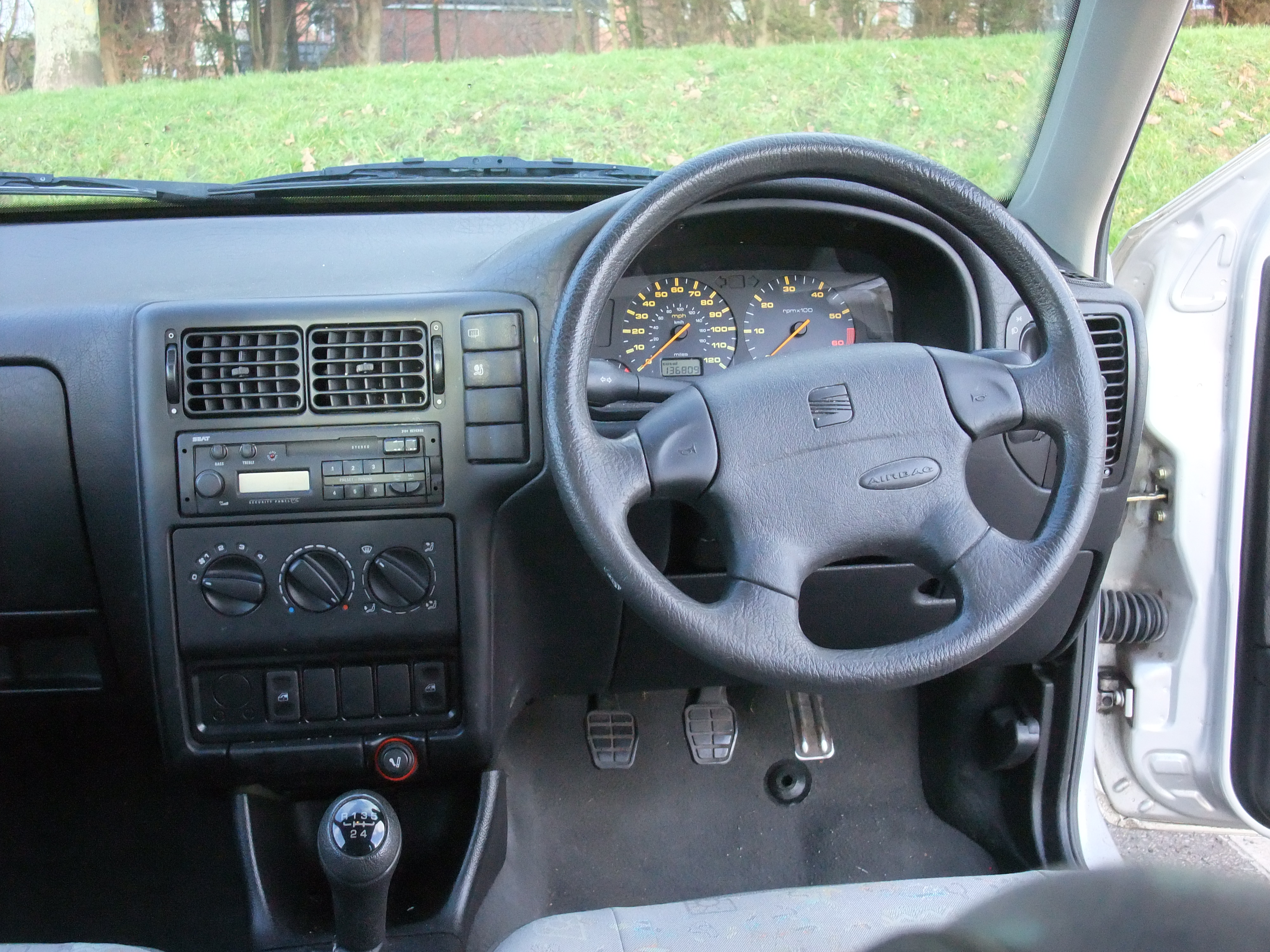
SEAT Ibiza Mk2 pre-facelift interior with airbags

=== 1996 revision ===
The 6K Ibiza had a minor facelift in 1996, which included changing the general aesthetics of the car, by adding smoother bumpers and changing the grille and headlamps and the trim levels offered (Base, E, S, SE, SXE, Sport, GT, GTI, GTI 16V, Cupra, and Sport).

In addition to changes to the appearance of the car, the powertrain and running gear changed with the addition of the 110 kW (150 PS; 148 bhp) 2.0-litre 16v ABF petrol engine.

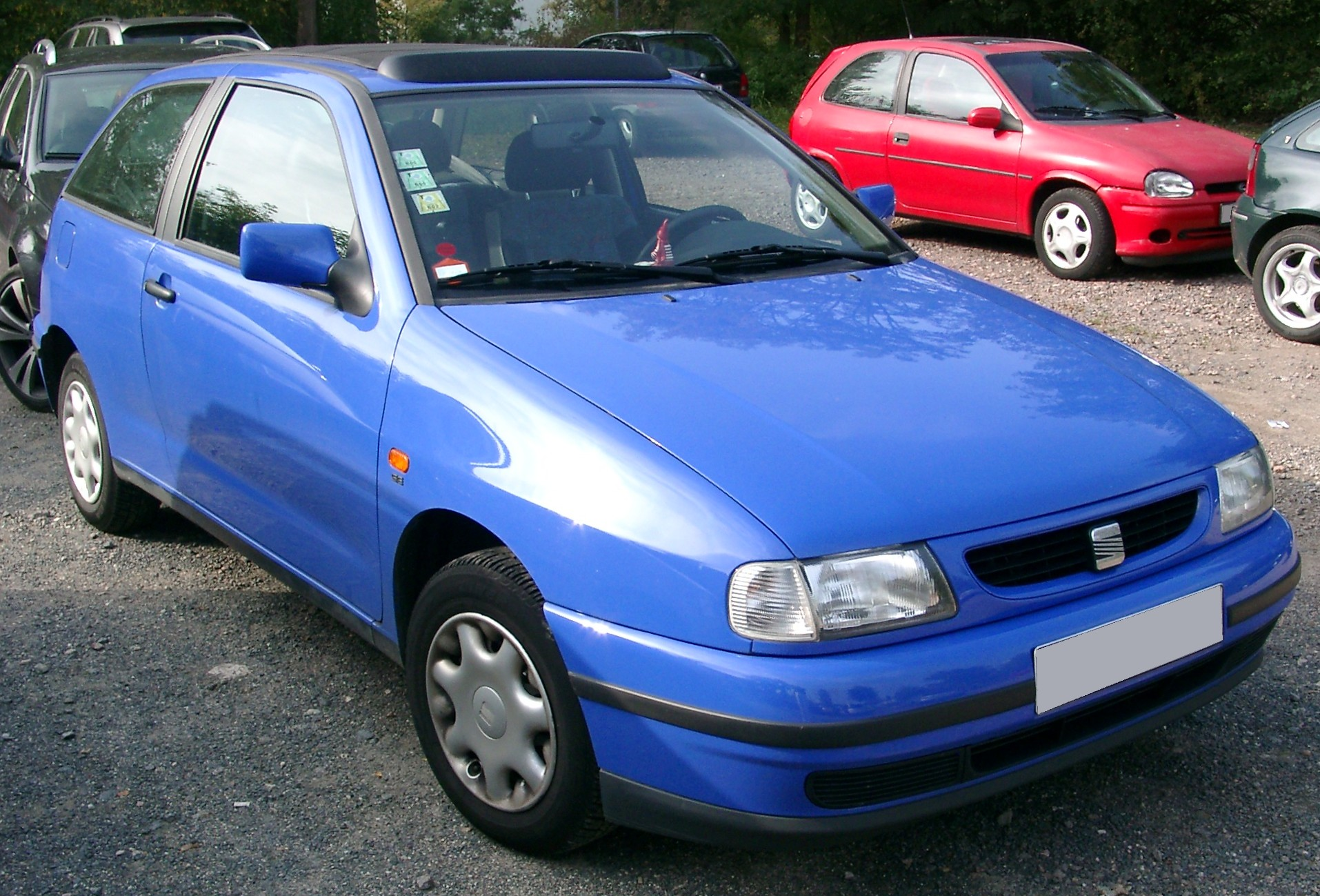
1996–1999 SEAT Ibiza Mk2 facelift 3-door

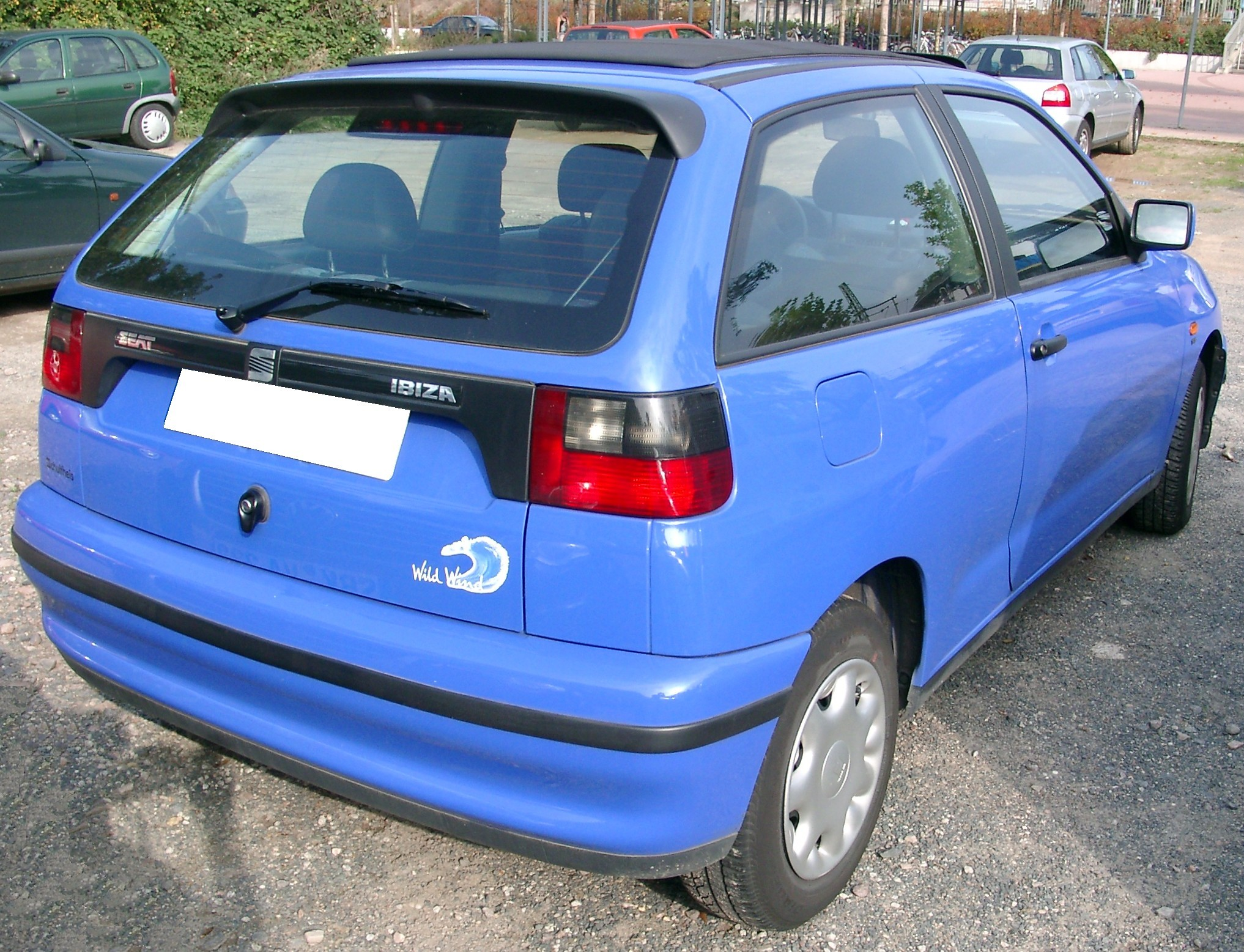
1996–1999 SEAT Ibiza Mk2 facelift 3-door

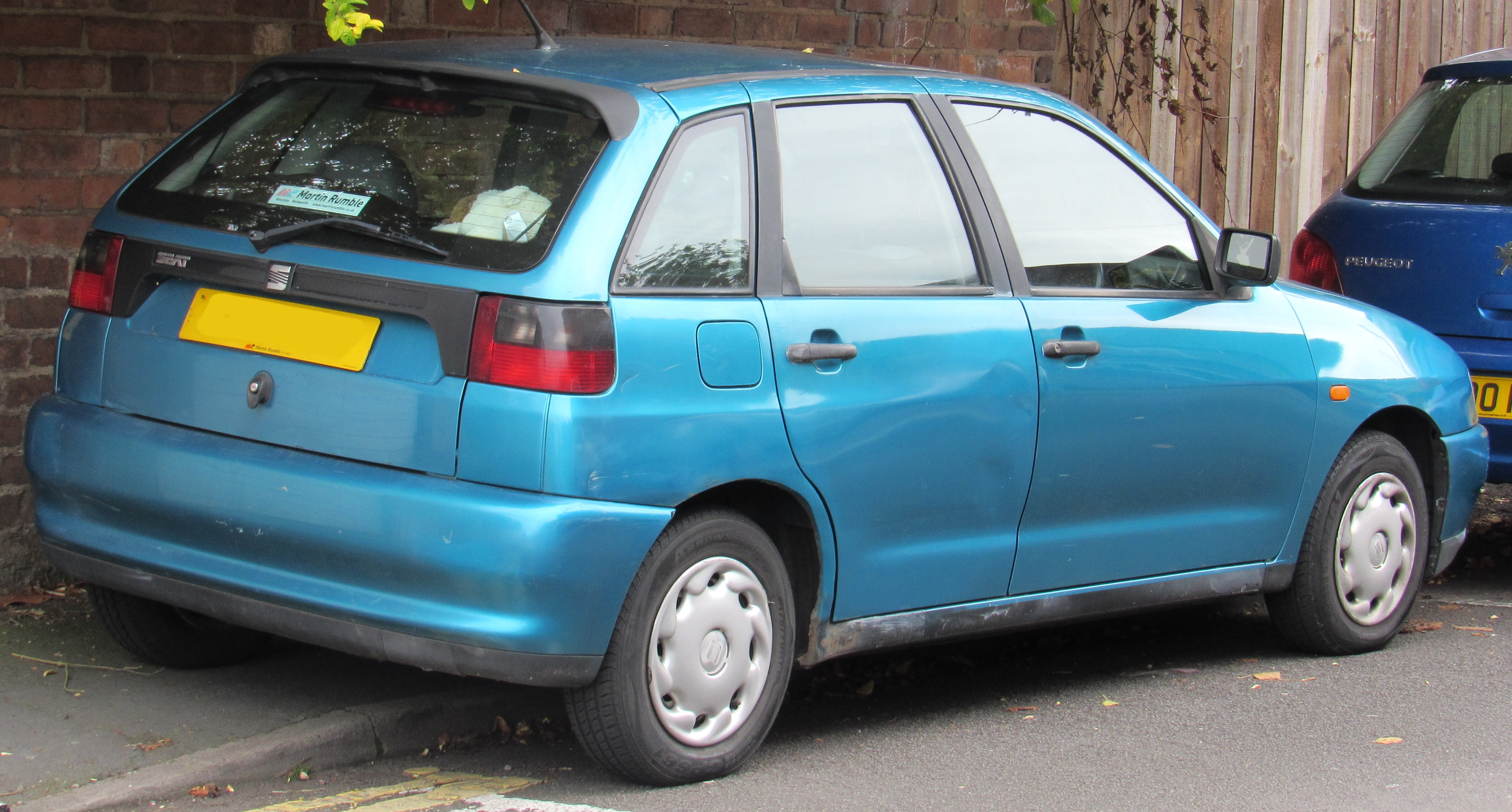
1997 SEAT Ibiza Mk2 facelift 5-door

==== Engine specifications ====
Model	Displacement	Valves	Max. power / rpm	Max. torque / rpm	Engine code	Production period
Petrol engines
1.0 MPI	999 cc	8	50 PS (37 kW; 49 hp) / 5000	86 N⋅m (63 lb⋅ft) / 3000–3600	AER	1996–1999
1.05 i	1,043 cc	8	45 PS (33 kW; 44 hp) / 5200	76 N⋅m (56 lb⋅ft) / 2800	AAU	1993–1996
1.3 i	1,272 cc	8	54 PS (40 kW; 53 hp) / 5000	95 N⋅m (70 lb⋅ft) / 3200–3400	AAV	1993–1994
1.4 i (Austria only)	1,390 cc	8	54 PS (40 kW; 53 hp) / 4700	116 N⋅m (86 lb⋅ft) Nm / 3000	ANX	1998–1999
1.4 i	1,391 cc	8	60 PS (44 kW; 59 hp) / 5200	107 N⋅m (79 lb⋅ft) / 2400–2800	ABD	1994–1996
1.4 MPI	1,390 cc	8	60 PS (44 kW; 59 hp) / 4700	116 N⋅m (86 lb⋅ft) / 2800–3200	AEX / APQ	1996–1999
1.4 MPI GT	1,390 cc	16	101 PS (74 kW; 100 hp) / 6000	128 N⋅m (94 lb⋅ft) / 4400	AFH	1996–1999
1.6 i	1,598 cc	8	75 PS (55 kW; 74 hp) / 5200	126 N⋅m (93 lb⋅ft) / 3400	ABU	1993–1994
1.6 i	1,595 cc	8	75 PS (55 kW; 74 hp) / 5200	125 N⋅m (92 lb⋅ft) / 2600	1F	1994–1997
1.6 MPI	1,598 cc	8	75 PS (55 kW; 74 hp) / 4800	135 N⋅m (100 lbf⋅ft) / 2800–3600	AEE	1997–1999
1.6 MPI	1,595 cc	8	101 PS (74 kW; 100 hp) / 5800	140 N⋅m (103 lb⋅ft) / 3500	AFT	1996–1999
1.8 i	1,781 cc	8	90 PS (66 kW; 89 hp) / 5500	145 N⋅m (107 lb⋅ft) / 2700–2900	ABS / ADZ	1993–1996
1.8 MPI GTI	1,781 cc	16	129 PS (95 kW; 127 hp) / 6000	165 N⋅m (122 lb⋅ft) / 4800	ADL	1994–1996
2.0 MPI GTI	1,984 cc	8	115 PS (85 kW; 113 hp) / 5400	166 N⋅m (122 lb⋅ft) / 3200	2E	1993–1996
2.0 MPI GTI	1,984 cc	8	115 PS (85 kW; 113 hp) / 5400	166 N⋅m (122 lb⋅ft) / 2600	AGG	1996–1999
2.0 Cupra	1,984 cc	16	150 PS (110 kW; 148 hp) / 6000	180 N⋅m (133 lbf⋅ft) / 4200–5000	ABF	1996–1999
Diesel engines
1.9 D	1,896 cc	8	64 PS (47 kW; 63 hp) / 4400	124 N⋅m (91 lb⋅ft) / 2000–3000	1Y	1996–1999
1.9 D	1,896 cc	8	68 PS (50 kW; 67 hp) / 4400	127 N⋅m (94 lb⋅ft)/ 2200–2600	1Y	1993–1996
1.9 SDI	1,896 cc	8	64 PS (47 kW; 63 hp) / 4200	125 N⋅m (92 lb⋅ft) / 2200–2800	AEY	1996–1999
1.9 TD	1,896 cc	8	75 PS (55 kW; 74 hp) / 4200	150 N⋅m (111 lbf⋅ft) / 2400–3400	AAZ	1993–1996
1.9 TDI	1,896 cc	8	90 PS (66 kW; 89 hp) / 4000	202 N⋅m (149 lb⋅ft) / 1900	1Z	July–December 1996
1.9 TDI (GT)	1,896 cc	8	90 PS (66 kW; 89 hp) / 4000	210 N⋅m (155 lbf⋅ft) / 1900	AHU	1996–1999
1.9 TDI GT	1,896 cc	8	110 PS (81 kW; 108 hp) / 4150	235 N⋅m (173 lb⋅ft) / 1900	AFN	1996–1999

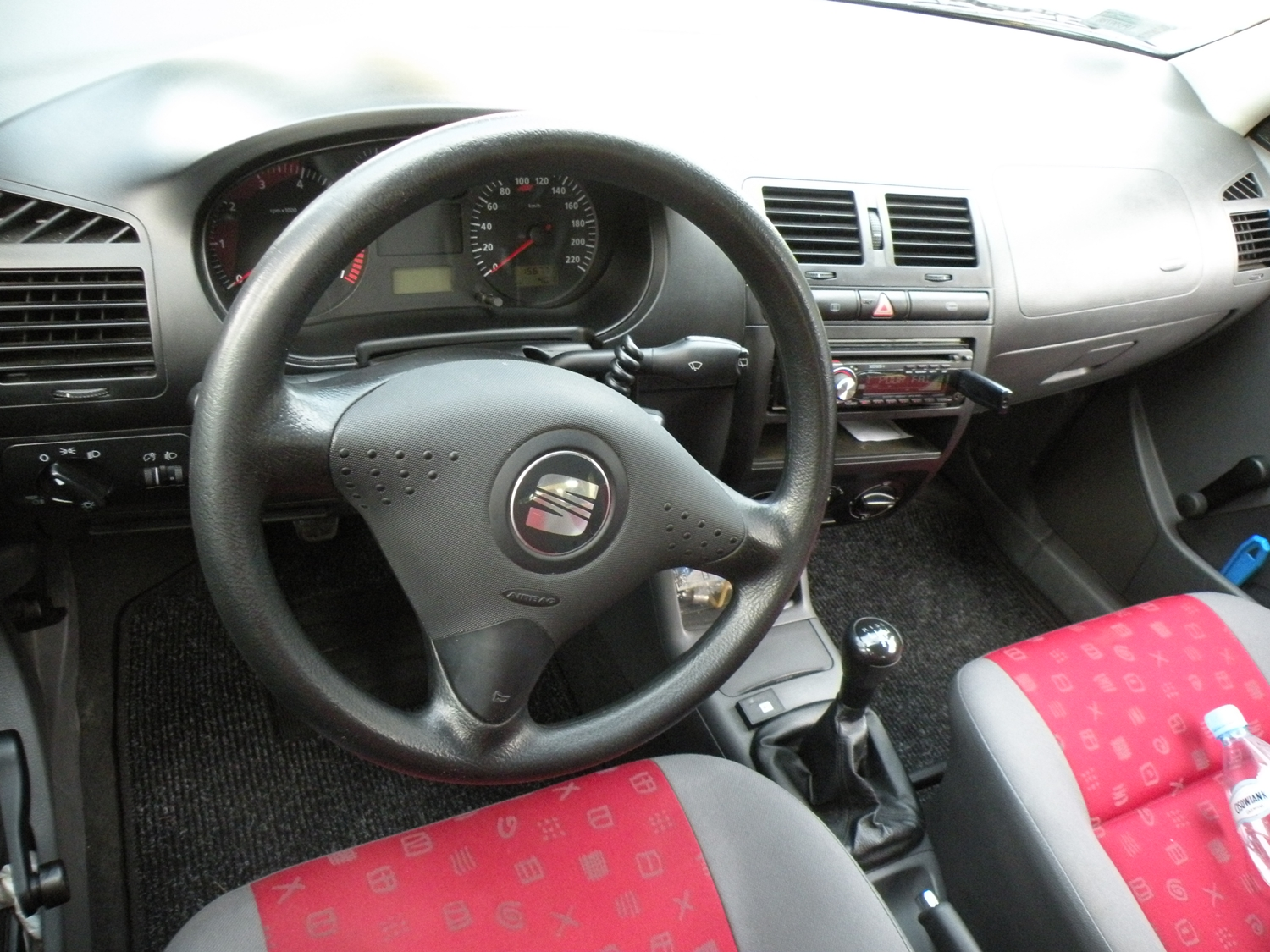
One of the new features introduced with the 1999 facelift was the redesigned interior

=== 1999 facelift ===
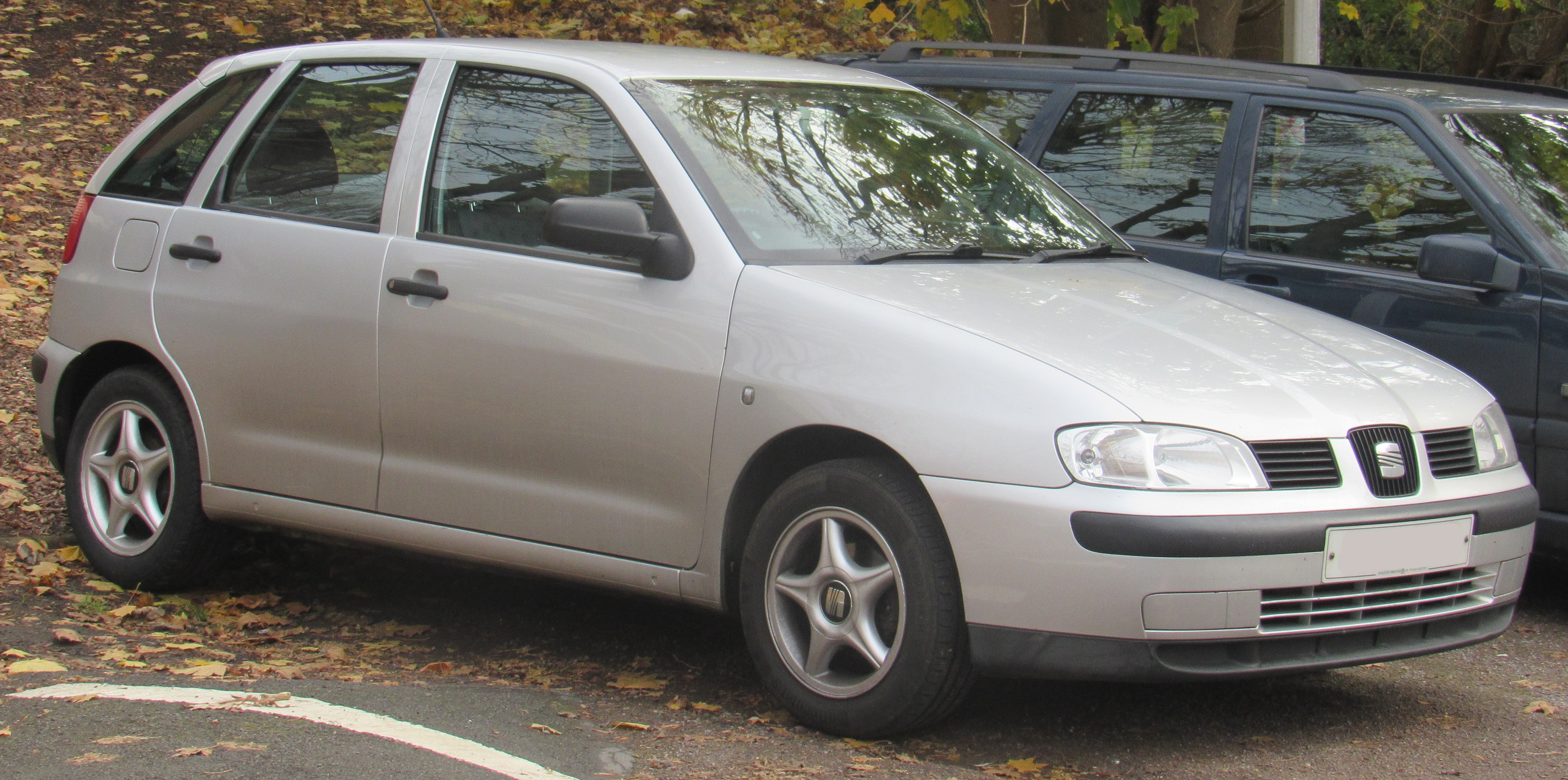
1999 SEAT Ibiza Mk2, 6K2 facelift

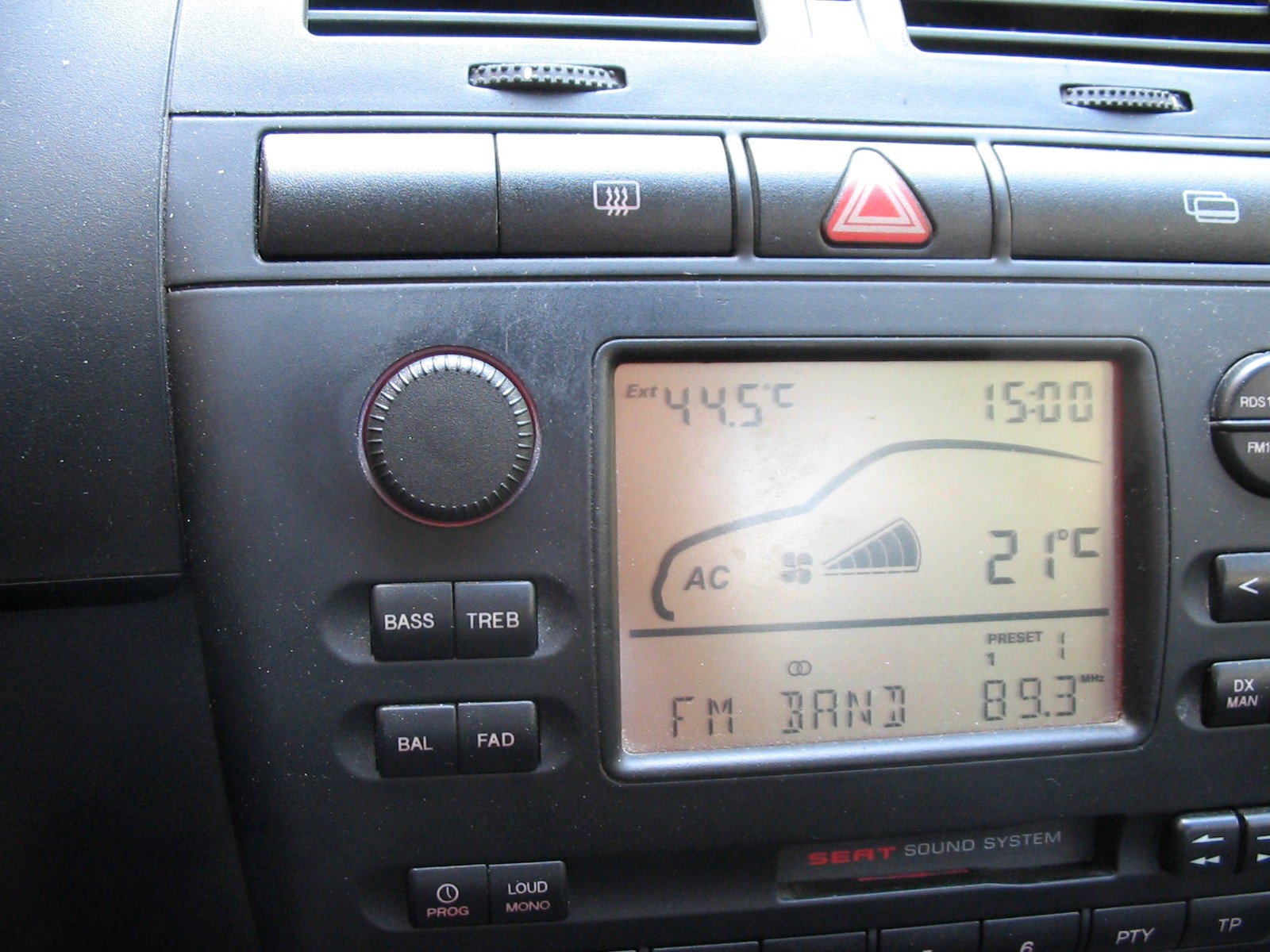
The red backlit LCD screen integrating the controllers for the audio as well as for the electronically automated air-conditioning system

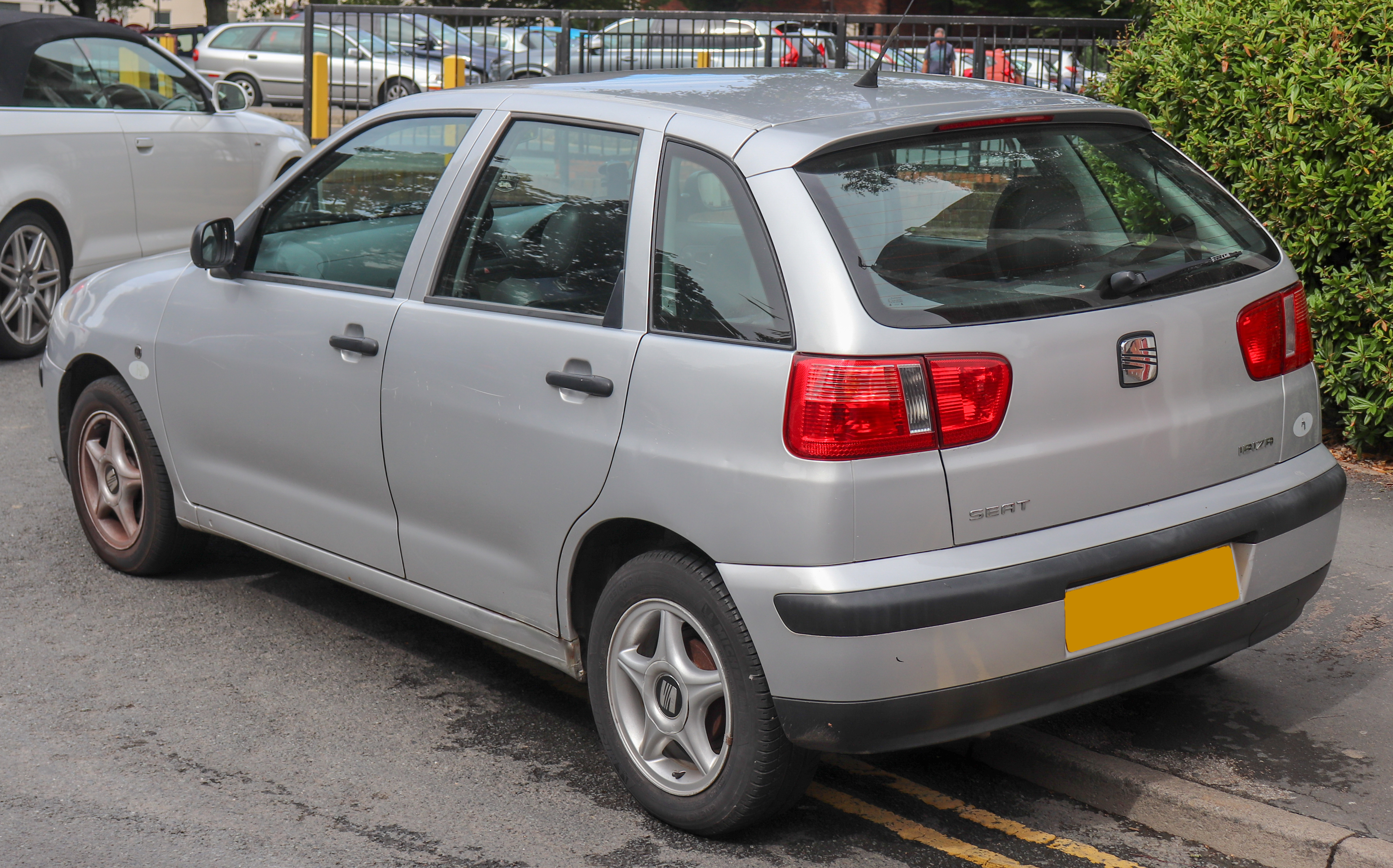
2001 SEAT Ibiza Mk2, 6K2 5-door facelift rear

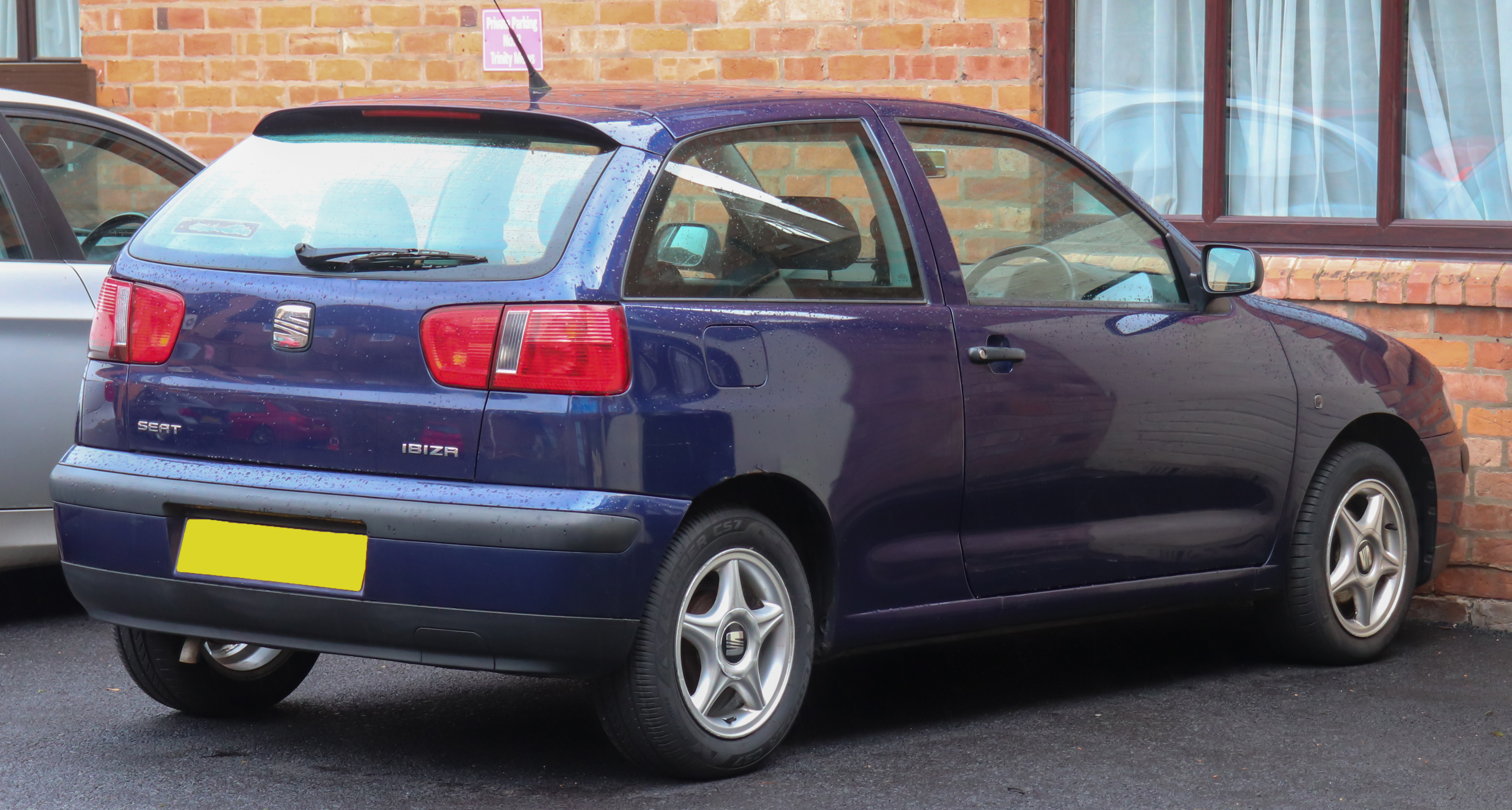
2002 SEAT Ibiza Mk2, 6K2 3-door facelift rear

The 1999 Ibiza Mk2 facelift (Typ 6K2, also known as 6K GP01, and sometimes referred to in the UK as the Mk3) was the second Ibiza to be produced under Volkswagen Group management. In addition to a revised front and rear end, new styling cues were added, such as the tailgate-mounted SEAT badge that doubled as a boot release switch when pushed. In the interior, the changes included a newly designed dashboard along with new door panels. The launch of the Cupra models, along with success in rallying, gave it a much stronger, sporty image, which helped align SEAT vis-à-vis the Volkswagen Group's recently acquired budget brand Škoda Auto.

The Ibiza's 1.05-, 1.4-, 1.6-, and 1.8-litre petrol, and 1.9-litre Turbocharged Direct Injection (TDI) and Suction Diesel Injection (SDI) diesel engines were the same as those used in the Volkswagen Polo. The Ibiza's powertrain and running gear were also used in the SEAT Córdoba saloon, estate, and coupé.

Under Volkswagen's ownership, SEAT was marketed as a sporty and youthful brand whose cars were sold at competitive prices. The available trim levels were Entry, S, SE, SX, Award, Stella, Signo, Sport (1.8T 20V 156 PS), Cupra, and Cupra R.

SEAT later introduced a more powerful hot hatch, dubbed the Cupra, equipped with a turbocharged 1.8-litre engine, followed by the Cupra R, of which only 200 units were produced. The main difference between the two were suspension, Brembo four-opposed piston front disc brake calipers, and a power upgrade from 156 PS (115 kW; 154 bhp) to 180 PS (132 kW; 178 bhp) on the Cupra R model.

By the time production of the second generation Ibiza/Córdoba ceased during 2002, the range had established itself as one of the most popular superminis in Europe of the past decade, having sold 1,522,607 cars from 1993 to 2002.

==== Engine specifications ====
Model	Displacement	Valves	Max. power / rpm	Max. torque / rpm	Engine code	Top speed	Production period
Petrol engines
1.0 MPI	999 cc	8	50 PS (37 kW; 49 hp) / 5000	86 N⋅m (63 lb⋅ft) / 3000–3600	ALD / ANV / AUC	145 km/h (90 mph)	1999–2002
1.0 MPI	999 cc	16	70 PS (51 kW; 69 hp) / 6200	91 N⋅m (67 lb⋅ft) / 4500	AVZ	165 km/h (103 mph)	2000–2002
1.4 MPI	1,390 cc	8	60 PS (44 kW; 59 hp) / 4700	116 N⋅m (86 lb⋅ft) / 3500	AKK / ANW / AUD	157 km/h (98 mph)	1999–2002
1.4 MPI	1,390 cc	16	75 PS (55 kW; 74 hp) / 5000	128 N⋅m (94 lb⋅ft) / 3300	APE / AUA	180 km/h (112 mph)	1999–2002
1.6 MPI	1,598 cc	8	75 PS (55 kW; 74 hp) / 4800	135 N⋅m (100 lb⋅ft) / 3200	ALM	170 km/h (106 mph)	1999–2000
1.6 MPI	1,595 cc	8	101 PS (74 kW; 100 hp) / 5600	145 N⋅m (107 lb⋅ft) / 3800	AKL / APF / AEH / AUR	195 km/h (121 mph)	1999–2002
20VT, 1.8T Cupra	1,781 cc	20	156 PS (115 kW; 154 hp) / 5800	210 N⋅m (155 lbf⋅ft) / 1800–5000	AQX / AYP	218 km/h (135 mph)	1999–2002
1.8T Cupra R	1,781 cc	20	180 PS (132 kW; 178 hp) / 5600	235 N⋅m (173 lb⋅ft) / 2100–5000	BBU	225 km/h (140 mph)	2002–2002
Diesel engines
1.9 SDI	1,896 cc	8	68 PS (50 kW; 67 hp) / 4200	133 N⋅m (98 lb⋅ft) / 2200–2600	AGP / AQM	161 km/h (100 mph)	1999–2002
1.9 TDI	1,896 cc	8	90 PS (66 kW; 89 hp) / 3750	210 N⋅m (155 lbf⋅ft) / 1900	AGR / ALH	180 km/h (112 mph)	1999–2002
1.9 TDI	1,896 cc	8	110 PS (81 kW; 108 hp) / 4150	235 N⋅m (173 lb⋅ft) / 1900	ASK / ASV	193 km/h (120 mph)	1999–2002

=== Safety ===
In 2000, the SEAT Ibiza Mk2 was tested for its safety performance under the Euro NCAP assessment scheme and it achieved a 3-star overall rating:

Overall rating	3/5 stars
Adult occupant	3/5 stars
Pedestrian	2/4 stars

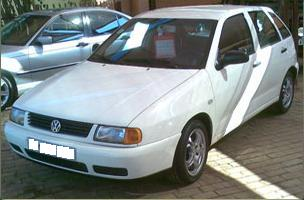
Volkswagen Polo Playa, a rebadged SEAT Ibiza Mk2 (South Africa)

=== Rebadges ===
The Ibiza's name was initially changed in Taiwan to Barcelona. The Ibiza was also produced in South Africa, where it was rebadged as the Volkswagen Polo Playa.

=== Awards ===
- Car of the year 1994, in Spain
- Car of the year award in 1994, in Portugal

== Third generation (Typ 6L; 2002) ==
SEAT Ibiza Mk3
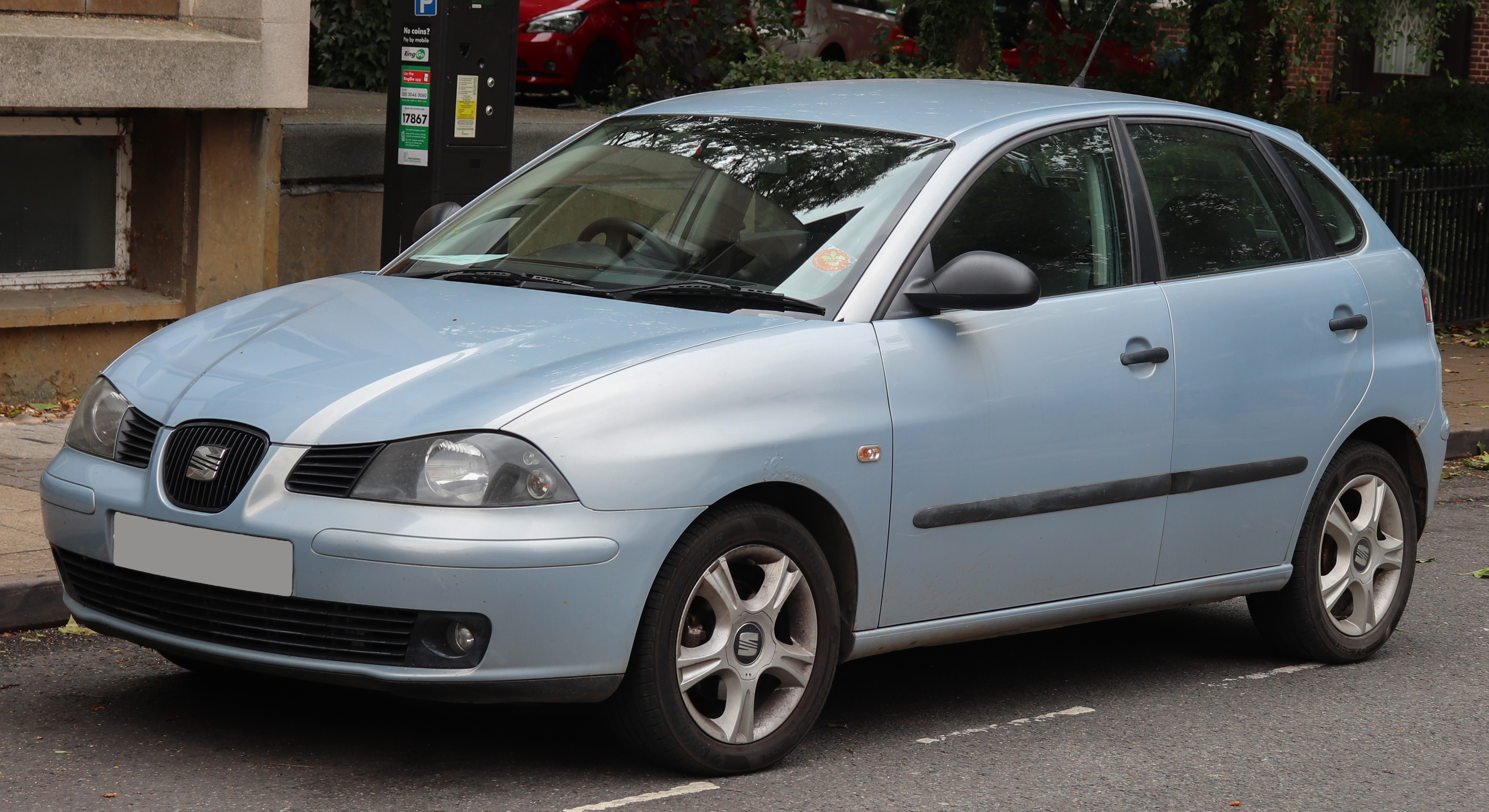
- SEAT Ibiza Mk3 pre-facelift, front view

Overview
- Model code: 6L
- Production: 2002–2008
- Assembly: Spain: Martorell, Barcelona, Catalonia; Slovakia: Bratislava
- Designer: Walter de Silva

Body and chassis
- Body style: 3 and 5-door hatchback
- Platform: Volkswagen Group A04 (PQ24)
- Related: SEAT Córdoba Mk2; Volkswagen Polo Mk4; Škoda Fabia Mk1; Škoda Fabia Mk2

Powertrain
- Engine: Petrol engines: 1.2 L I3; 1.4 L I4; 1.6 L I4; 1.8 L I4 20v Turbo; 2.0 L I4; Diesel engines: 1.4 L AMF TDI I3; 1.9 L SDI I4; 1.9 L TDI I4
- Transmission: 5/6 Speed manual 4/5 Speed automatic

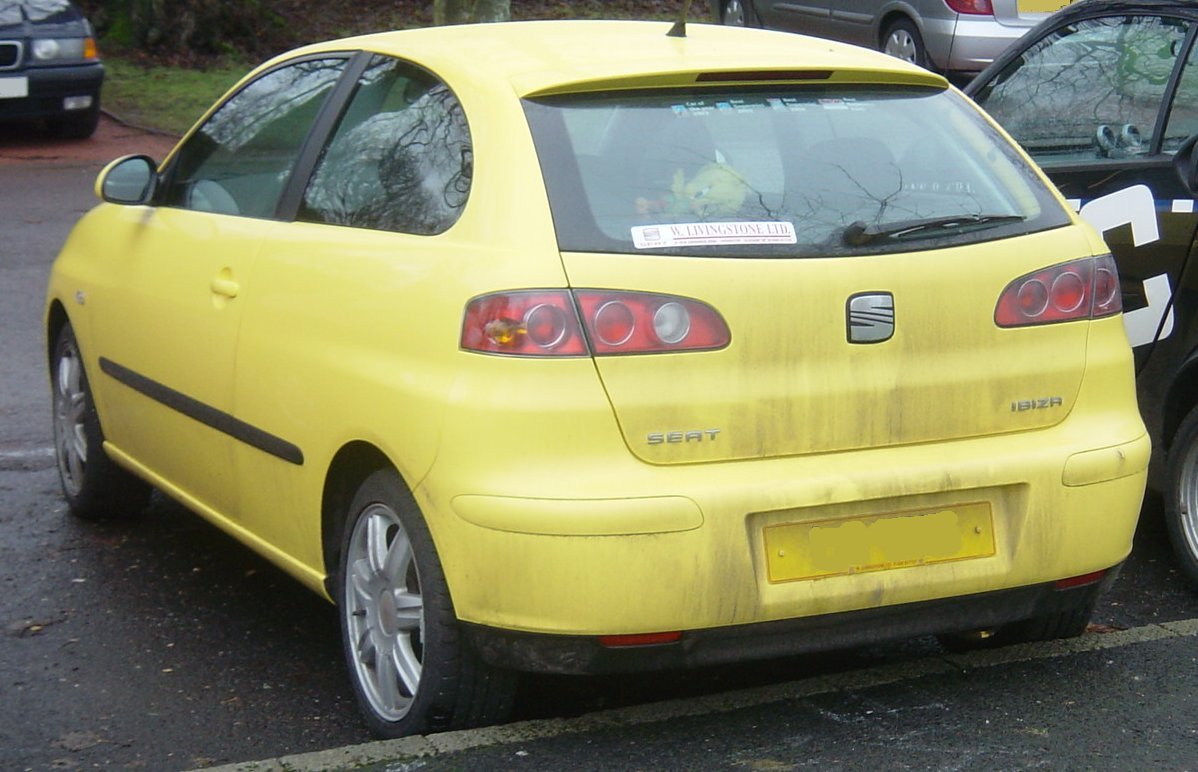
SEAT Ibiza Mk3 pre-facelift 3-door

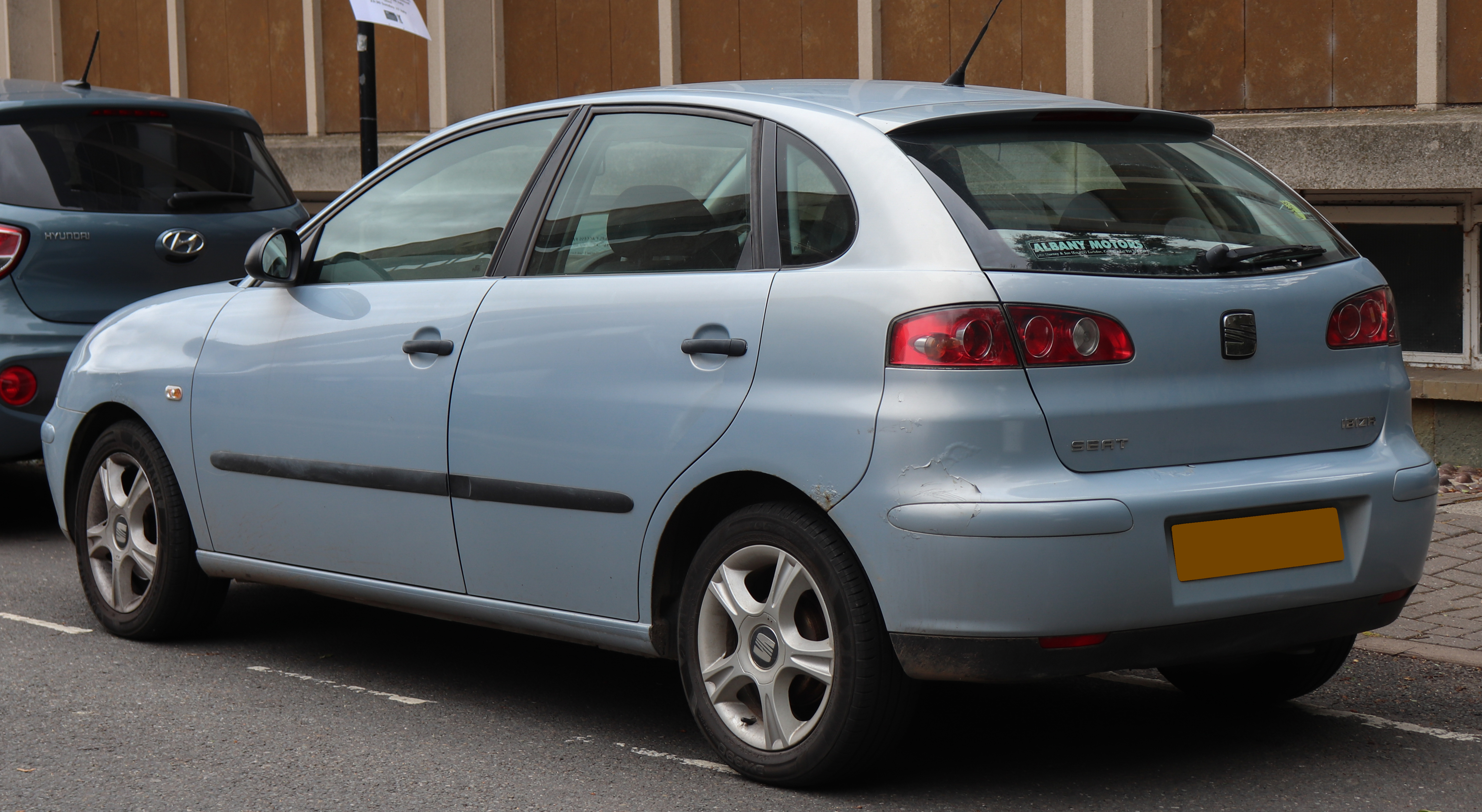
SEAT Ibiza Mk3 pre-facelift 5-door

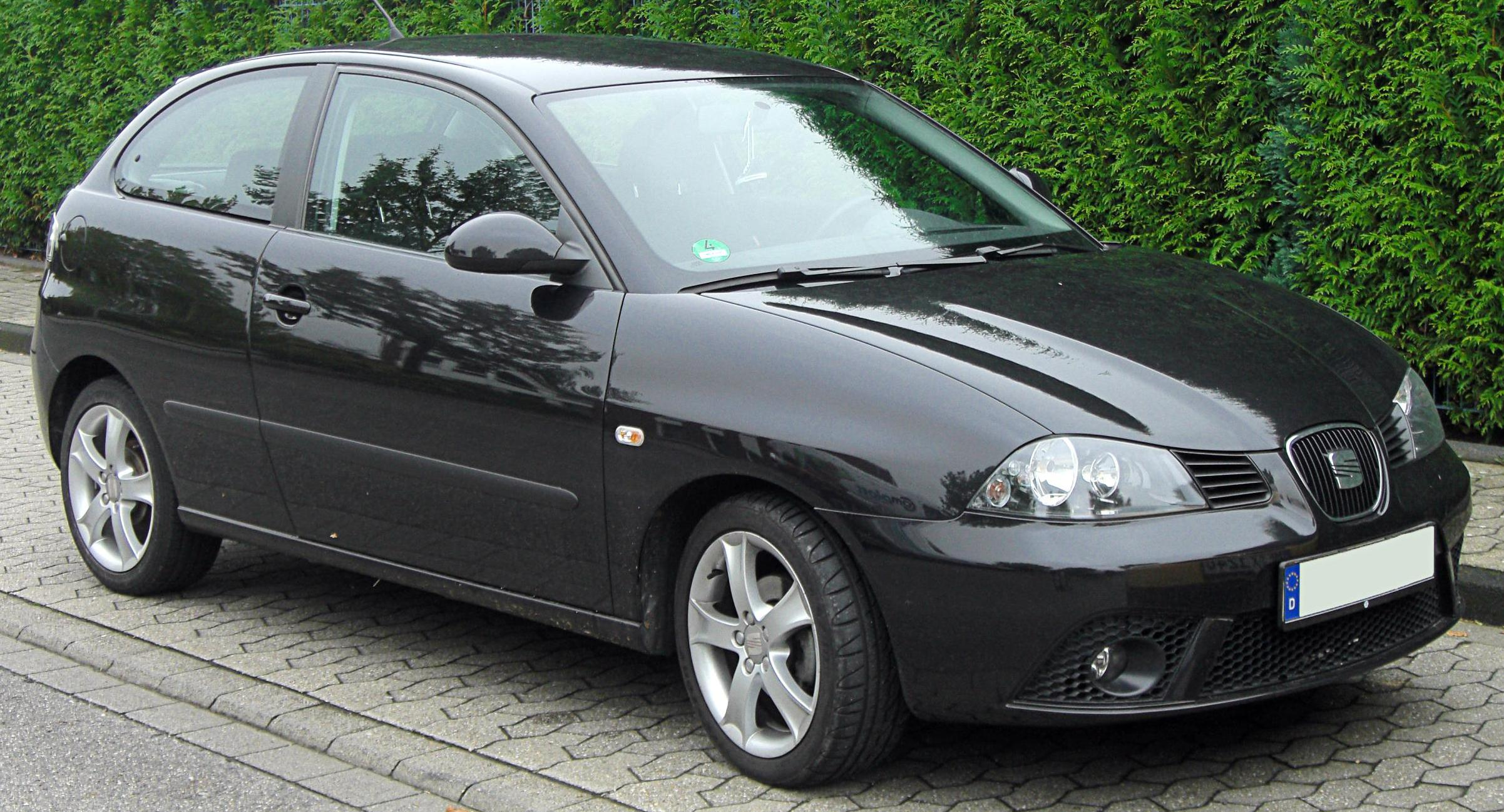

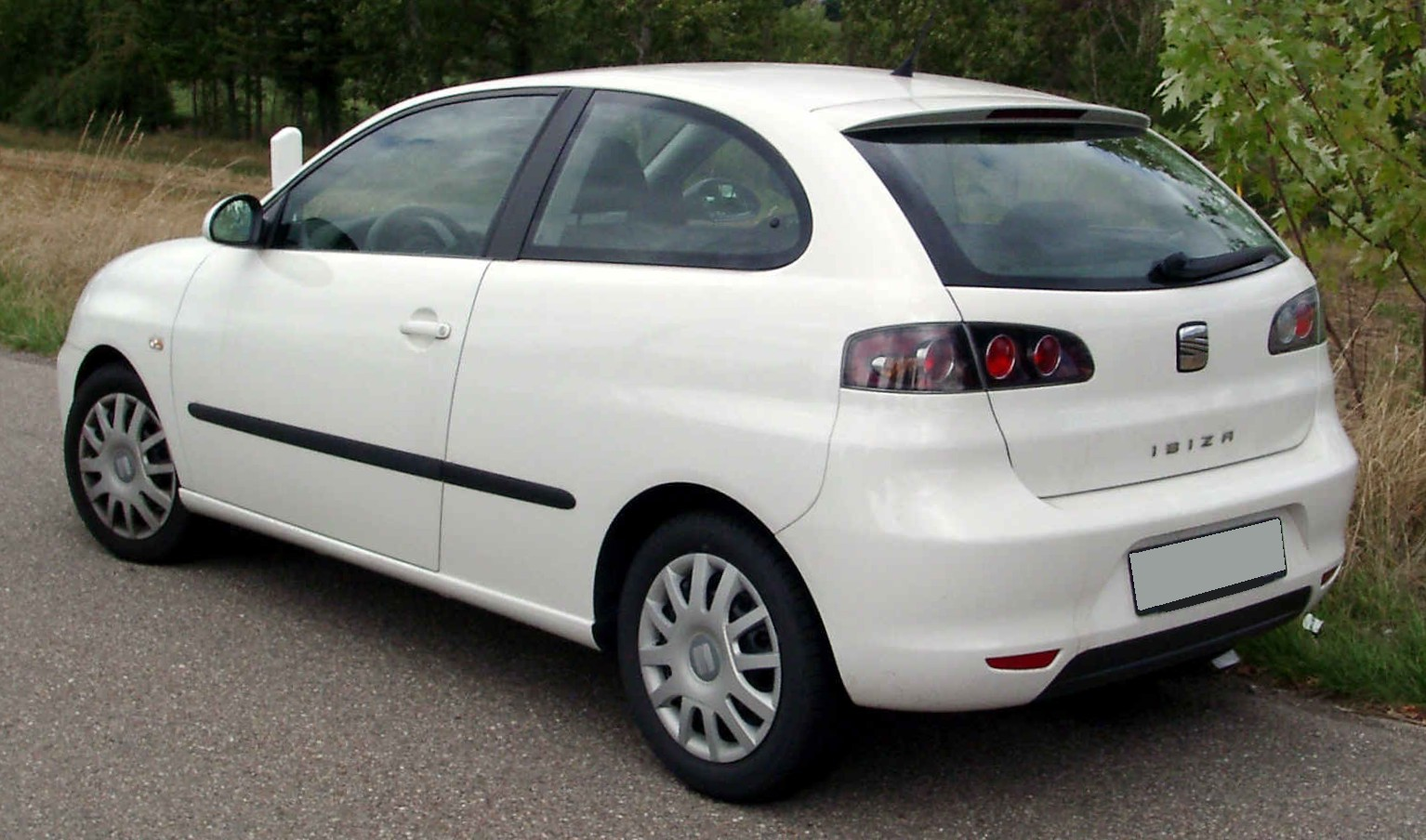
SEAT Ibiza Mk3 facelift 3-door

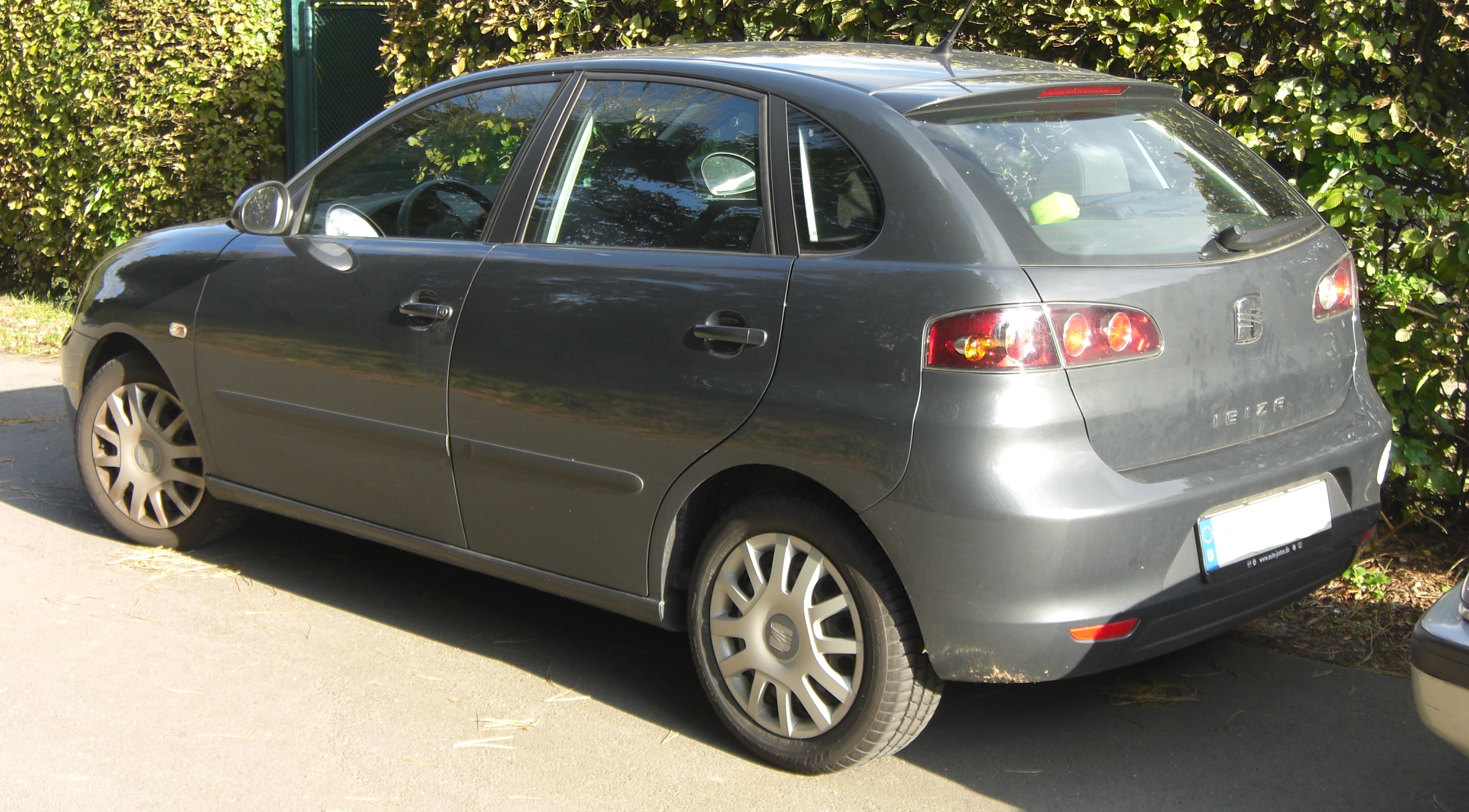
SEAT Ibiza Mk3 facelift 5-door

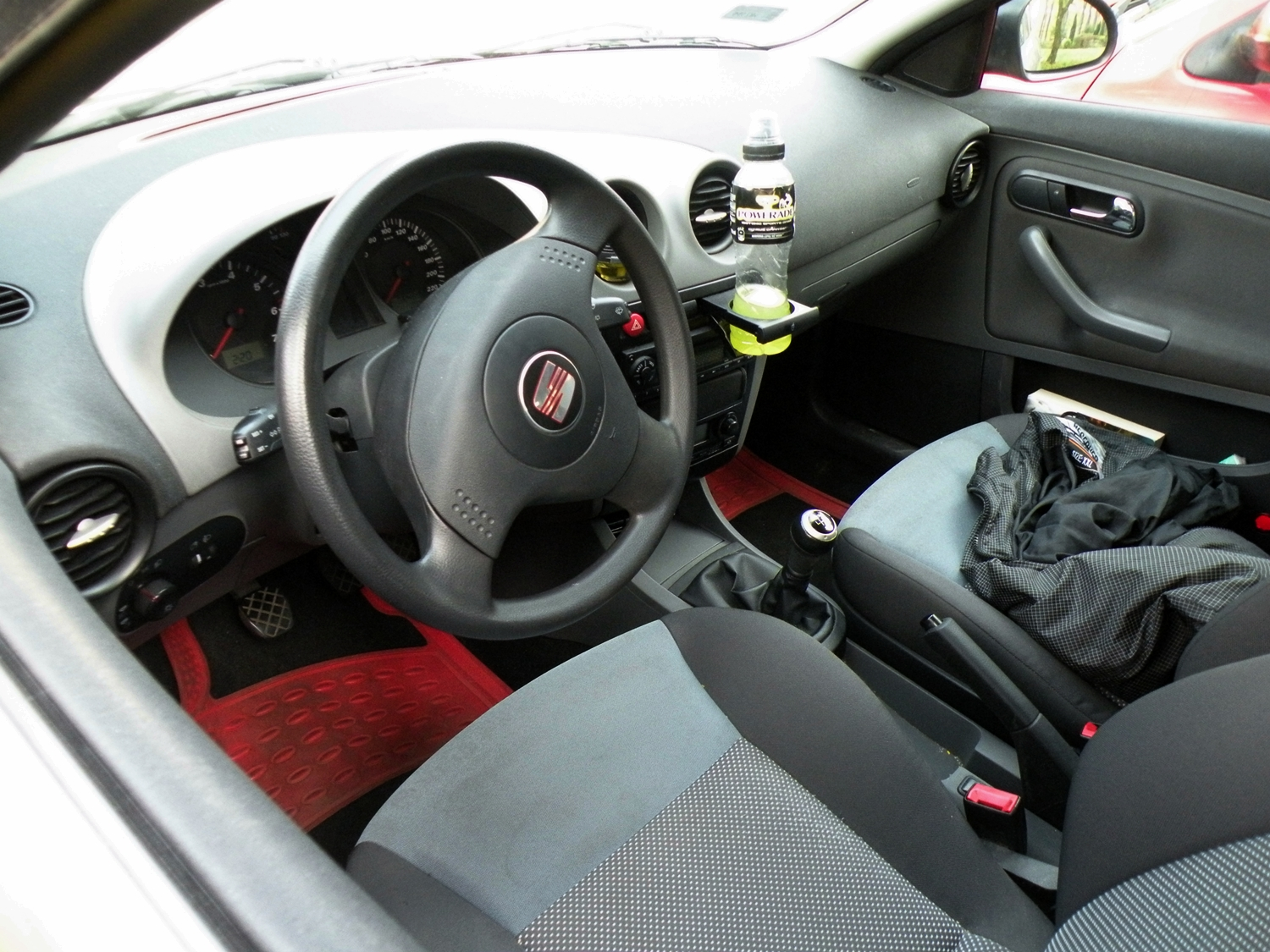
SEAT Ibiza Mk3 interior

The Ibiza Mk3 (Type 6L) was the second Ibiza generation to be fully produced under Volkswagen Group ownership. Built on the same PQ24 platform as the Volkswagen Polo Mk4 (Type 9N), it was styled by Italian designer Walter de Silva to have a sporty, performance image. The model lineup included two hot hatch variants, the Ibiza FR and Cupra, which compensated for the lack of Polo hot hatch variants (the Polo GTI wasn't launched until 2006).

Its production was initially focused in SEAT's main plant in Martorell, Spain, however in September 2002 a decision was taken by the Volkswagen Group that a part of the production (up to 50,000 units annually) would be transferred to Volkswagen's plant in Bratislava, Slovakia.

Apart from the more aggressive styling, it was larger than the previous two generations, with room for five adults, and a spacious (if rather short) boot. The standard trim level on this model was noticeably higher than previous models. This was regarded by some magazines to be the best supermini, with What Car? magazine calling it "Car of the Year" in 2003, and their "Supermini of the Year" for three years in a row.

The SEAT Ibiza Mk3 was also used for several purposes, from police cars to rally cars.

The Ibiza Mk3 pre-facelift model was available with the Award, S, SX, Stylance, Reference, Signo, Stella, Sport, FR, and Cupra R trim levels.

The facelifted third generation Ibiza was made from 2006 to 2008. In 2006, slight cosmetic changes were made to both the interior and exterior, but otherwise the model was very similar to the original Mk3. New trim levels were introduced in 2006 as well: Reference, Stylance, Freerider, Sportrider, Sport, DAB Sport (2006 limited edition), Formula Sport (2007 limited edition), FR, and Cupra, as well as engines with increased power (1.2-litre 12v and 1.4-litre 16v) and a new 1.4-litre TDI diesel version. The FR and Cupra R TDI versions used a 1.9-litre Pumpe-Düse diesel engine with 130 PS (96 kW; 128 bhp) and 160 PS (118 kW; 158 bhp) respectively. The top petrol versions used a 1.8-litre 20v turbo engine with 150 PS (110 kW; 148 bhp) for the FR model and 180 PS (132 kW; 178 bhp) for the Cupra R model. The Ibiza Cupra R TDI and Cupra R 1.8T versions were the top models of the brand, hot hatches designed to compete with rivals in the front-wheel-drive hot hatch segment.

=== Engine specifications ===
Model	Displacement	Configuration	Valves	Max. power at rpm	Max. torque at rpm	Engine code	Top speed	Production period
Petrol engines
1.2	1,198 cc	Inline-3 OHC	6	54 PS (40 kW; 53 hp) / 4750	106 N⋅m (78 lb⋅ft) / 3000	AWY / BMD	155 km/h (96 mph)	2002–2007
1.2	1,198 cc	Inline-3 OHC	6	60 PS (44 kW; 59 hp) / 5200	108 N⋅m (80 lb⋅ft) / 3000	BBM	159 km/h (99 mph)	2007–2008
1.2	1,198 cc	Inline-3 DOHC	12	64 PS (47 kW; 63 hp) / 5400	112 N⋅m (83 lb⋅ft) / 3000	AZQ / BME	166 km/h (103 mph)	2002–2005
1.2	1,198 cc	Inline-3 DOHC	12	70 PS (51 kW; 69 hp) / 5400	112 N⋅m (83 lb⋅ft) / 3000	BZG	170 km/h (106 mph)	2006–2008
1.4	1,390 cc	Inline-4 DOHC	16	75 PS (55 kW; 74 hp) / 5000	126 N⋅m (93 lb⋅ft) / 3800	AUA / BBY / BKY	169–173 km/h (105–107 mph)	2002–2006
1.4	1,390 cc	Inline-4 DOHC	16	86 PS (63 kW; 85 hp) / 5000	132 N⋅m (97 lb⋅ft) / 3800	BXW	180 km/h (112 mph)	2006–2008
1.4	1,390 cc	Inline-4 DOHC	16	101 PS (74 kW; 100 hp) / 6000	126 N⋅m (93 lb⋅ft) / 4400	AUB / BBZ	190 km/h (118 mph)	2007–2008
1.6	1,598 cc	Inline-4 OHC	8	101 PS (74 kW; 100 hp) / 5500	140 N⋅m (103 lbf⋅ft) / 3250	BAH	187 km/h (116 mph)	2002–2009
1.6	1,598 cc	Inline-4 DOHC	16	105 PS (77 kW; 104 hp) / 5600	153 N⋅m (113 lb⋅ft) / 3800	BTS	193 km/h (120 mph)	2006–2008
1.8T FR	1,781 cc	Inline-4 DOHC	20	150 PS (110 kW; 148 hp) / 5800	220 N⋅m (162 lbf⋅ft) / 1950	BJX	216 km/h (134 mph)	2004–2008
1.8T Cupra R	1,781 cc	Inline-4 DOHC	20	180 PS (132 kW; 178 hp) / 5800	245 N⋅m (181 lb⋅ft) / 2000	BBU	230 km/h (143 mph)	2004–2008
2.0	1,984 cc	Inline-4 OHC	8	115 PS (85 kW; 113 hp) / 5200	170 N⋅m (125 lbf⋅ft) / 2400	AZL / BBX	200 km/h (124 mph)	2003–2004 (until 2009 for Latin-America)
Diesel engines
1.4 TDI	1,422 cc	Inline-3 OHC	6	70 PS (51 kW; 69 hp) / 4000	155 N⋅m (114 lb⋅ft) / 1600–2800	BNM	166 km/h (103 mph)	2005–2008
1.4 TDI	1,422 cc	Inline-3 OHC	6	75 PS (55 kW; 74 hp) / 4000	195 N⋅m (144 lb⋅ft) / 2200	AMF / BAY	180 km/h (112 mph)	2003–2005
1.4 TDI	1,422 cc	Inline-3 OHC	6	80 PS (59 kW; 79 hp) / 4000	195 N⋅m (144 lb⋅ft) / 2200	BNV / BMS	176 km/h (109 mph)	2005–2007
1.9 SDI	1,896 cc	Inline-4 OHC	8	64 PS (47 kW; 63 hp) / 4000	125 N⋅m (92 lb⋅ft) / 1600–2800	ASY	162 km/h (101 mph)	2002–2006
1.9 TDI	1,896 cc	Inline-4 OHC	8	101 PS (74 kW; 100 hp) / 4000	240 N⋅m (177 lbf⋅ft) / 1800–2400	ATD / AXR / BMT	190 km/h (118 mph)	2002–2008
1.9 TDI; Sport/FR	1,896 cc	Inline-4 OHC	8	130 PS (96 kW; 128 hp) / 4000	310 N⋅m (229 lbf⋅ft) / 1900	ASZ / BLT	206 km/h (128 mph) (Sport); 208 km/h (129 mph) (FR)	2002–2003 (Sport); 2004–2008 (FR)
1.9 TDI; Cupra R	1,896 cc	Inline-4 OHC	8	160 PS (118 kW; 158 hp) / 3750	330 N⋅m (243 lbf⋅ft) / 1900	BPX / BUK	220 km/h (137 mph)	2004–2008

=== Safety ===
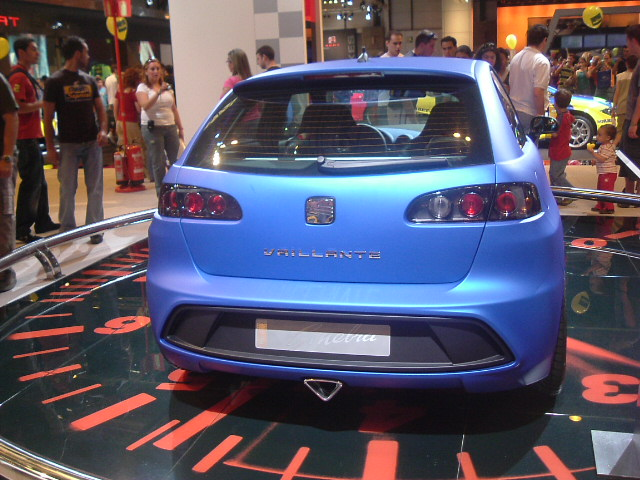
SEAT Ibiza Vaillante concept car

In 2002, the SEAT Ibiza Mk3 was tested for its safety performance under the Euro NCAP assessment scheme and it achieved a 4-star overall rating:

Overall rating	4/5 stars
Adult occupant	4/5 stars
Pedestrian	2/4 stars

=== Awards ===
- Car of the Year award in 2003, by the British magazine WhatCar?
- Supermini of the Year award three years in a row, by the British magazine WhatCar?

=== Concept cars ===
At the 2006 Geneva Motorshow, SEAT presented the SEAT Ibiza Vaillante concept car, which was based on a three-door SEAT Ibiza Mk3.

== Fourth generation (6J/6P; 2008) ==
SEAT Ibiza Mk4
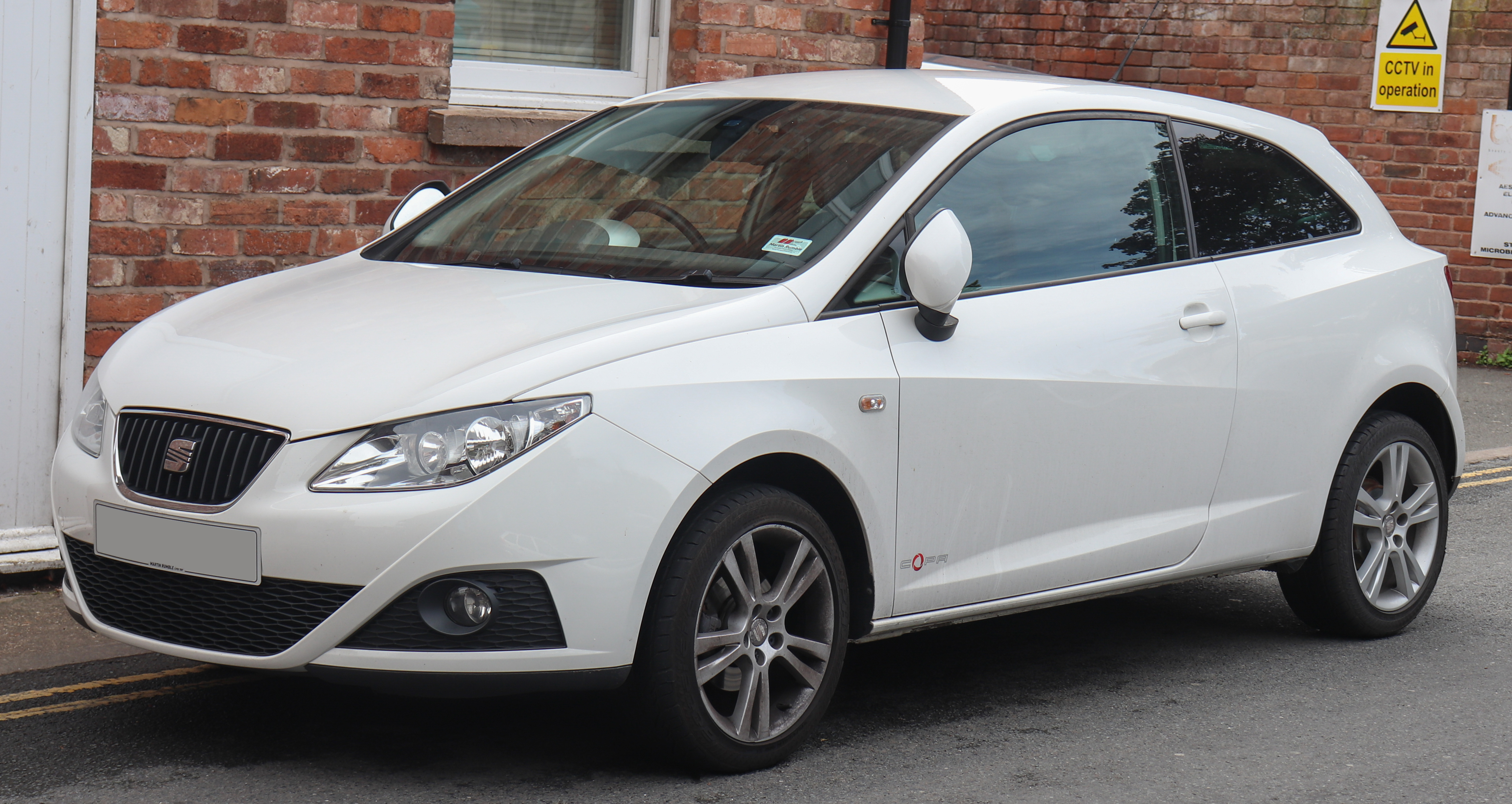

Overview
- Model code: 6J
- Production: 2008–2017
- Assembly: Spain: Martorell, Catalonia; Algeria: Relizane
- Designer: Luc Donckerwolke

Body and chassis
- Body style: 3 and 5-door hatchback 5-door estate
- Platform: Volkswagen Group A05 (PQ25)
- Related: Volkswagen Polo Mk5; Audi A1; Škoda Fabia Mk3

Powertrain
- Engine: Petrol engines: 1.0 L I3; 1.0 L TSI I3; 1.2 L I3; 1.2 L TSI I3; 1.2 L TSI I4; 1.4 L I4; 1.4 L twincharger I4; 1.6 L I4; 1.8 L TSI I4; 2.0 L I4 (Mexico); Diesel engines: 1.2 L TDI CR I3; 1.4 L TDI PD I3; 1.6 L TDI CR I4; 1.9 L TDI PD I4; 2.0 L TDI CR I4
- Transmission: 5-speed manual 6-speed manual 7-speed DSG automatic

Dimensions
- Wheelbase: 2,469 mm (97.2 in)
- Length: 4,031–4,072 mm (158.7–160.3 in) (3-door); 4,052 mm (159.5 in) (5-door); 4,227 mm (166.4 in) (estate)
- Width: 1,693 mm (66.7 in)
- Height: 1,420–1,428 mm (55.9–56.2 in) (3-door); 1,445 mm (56.9 in) (5-door, estate)
- Kerb weight: 974–1,172 kg (2,147–2,584 lb) (3-door); 999–1,120 kg (2,202–2,469 lb) (5-door)

Chronology
- Successor: SEAT Arona (for Ibiza ST)

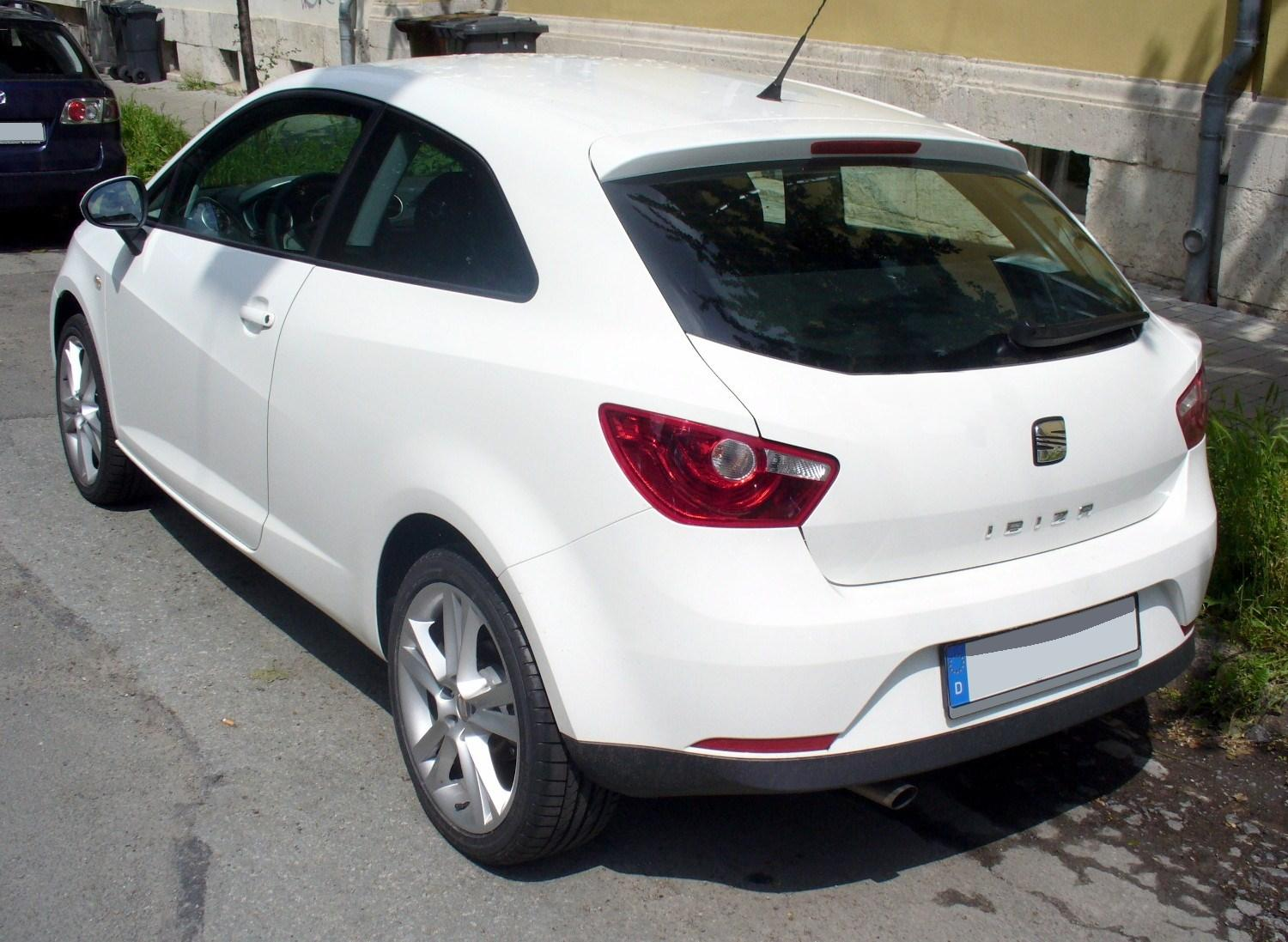
SEAT Ibiza SC, rear view

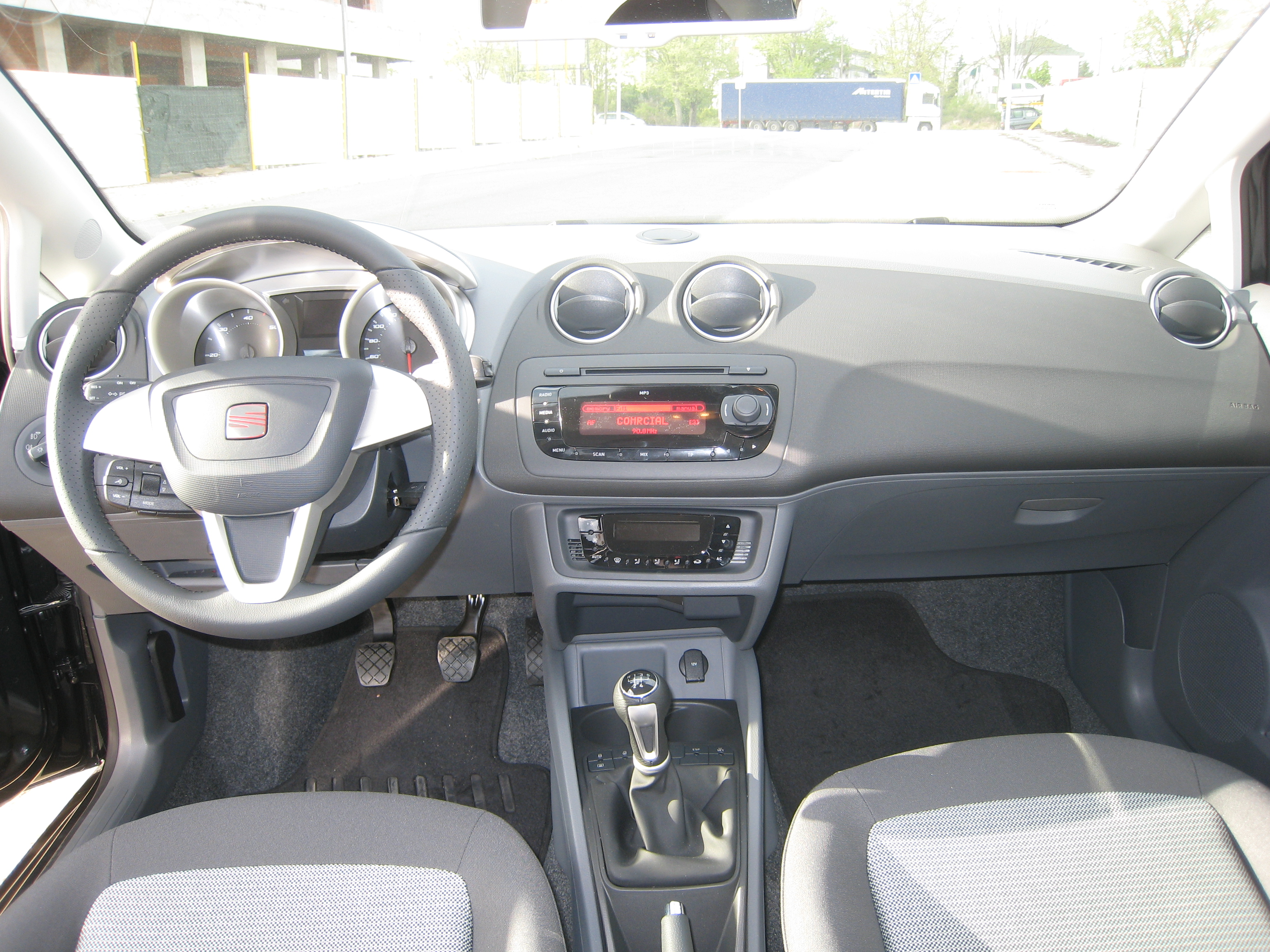
SEAT Ibiza Mk4 interior

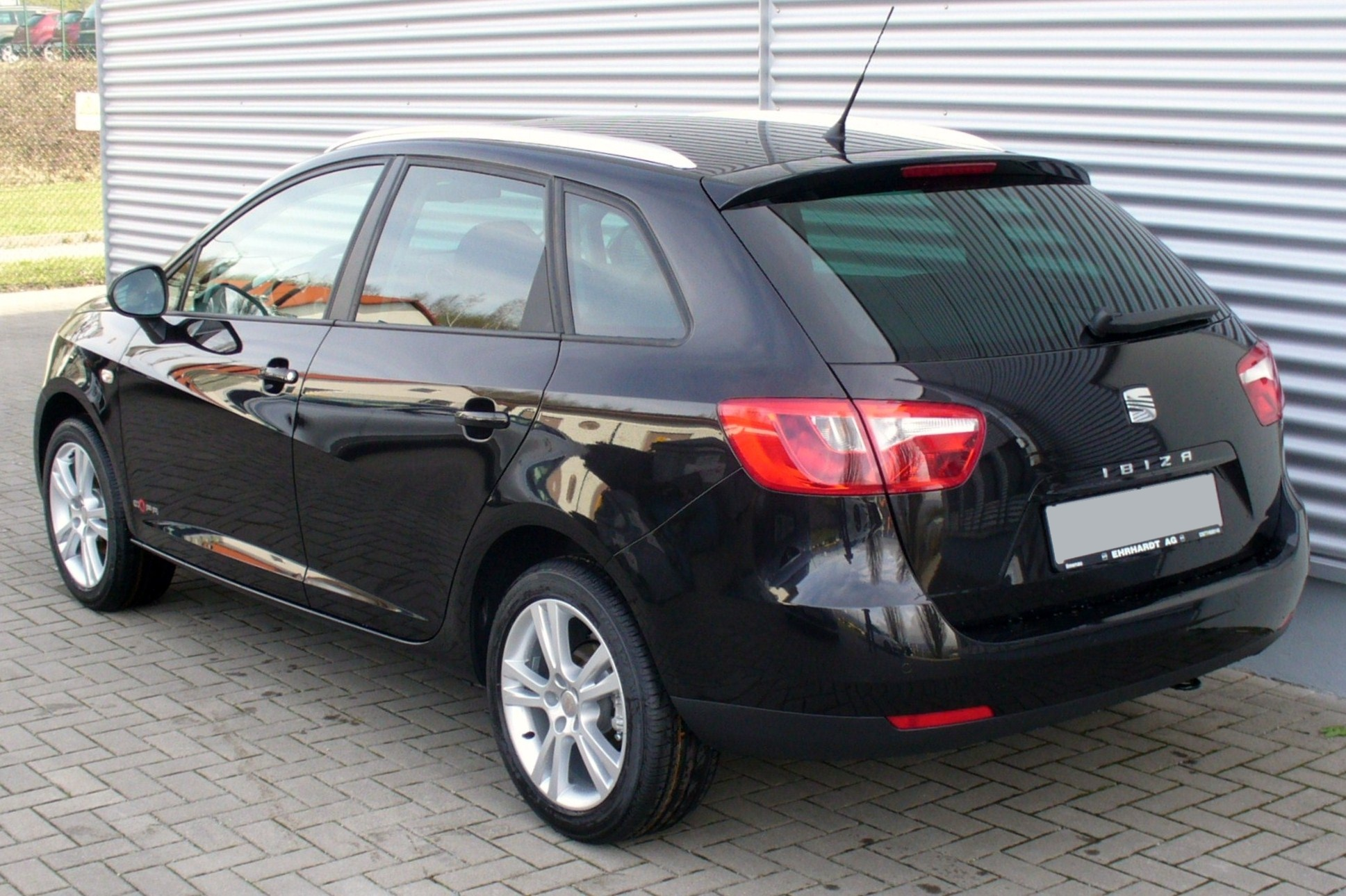
SEAT Ibiza ST

The Ibiza Mk4 (Type 6J) was previewed at the 2008 Geneva Motor Show in the form of the Bocanegra concept car. It was styled by Belgian car designer Luc Donckerwolke with a distinctive "arrow design", dispensing with the basic Ibiza design language that had been in place since the 1984 original. It was the first among other Volkswagen Group models (Volkswagen Polo Mk5 and Audi A1) to use the latest Volkswagen Group PQ25 platform in the segment of supermini cars.

The model range featured a 5-door hatchback, a 3-door version, and a 5-door estate; the latter was added in Q4 2010.

The new model first went on sale in the middle of 2008, in the 5-door format, followed by a 3-door variant, marketed as the Ibiza SportCoupé or Ibiza SC. An Ibiza Ecomotive model, powered by an 80 PS (59 kW; 79 bhp), 1.4-litre diesel engine emitting 98 g/km of CO_{2}, was launched in late 2008.

High-performance Ibiza FR, Cupra, and Bocanegra models were launched in June 2009. The Ibiza FR was powered by a 150 PS (110 kW; 148 bhp) 1.4-litre TSI twincharger (turbo and supercharger) engine with a seven-speed Direct-Shift Gearbox (DSG), while the Ibiza Cupra and Bocanegra have the same powertrain tuned to 180 PS (132 kW; 178 bhp).

In January 2010, SEAT introduced, for the first time in the Volkswagen Group on the Ibiza's specific platform, the 2.0-litre TDI Diesel engine in both a SportCoupe and a five-door Ibiza FR specification. The 2.0 TDI boasts 143 PS (105 kW; 141 bhp) and an average consumption of 4.6 L/100 km (61 mpg_{‑imp}; 51 mpg_{‑US}).

In September 2010, the Ibiza's SportCoupe and 5-door variants were extended with the addition of the new 1.2-litre TSI 105 PS (77 kW; 104 bhp) engine.

A special version of the Ibiza Mk4, called "25th anniversary", was presented at the Barcelona Motor Show in 2009, to celebrate the 25th anniversary of the Ibiza.

There were many different trim levels for the Ibiza Mk4. From 2009 onwards, the SEAT Ibiza was used exclusively by the UK-based Young Driver Scheme. The Young Driver Scheme uses a mixture of the SportsCoupe and 5-door variants, powered by the 1.2-litre engine.

In July 2010, a revised Ibiza Ecomotive was announced, powered by a 75 PS (55 kW; 74 bhp) 1.2-litre TDI common rail diesel engine with CO_{2} emissions of 89 g/km.

=== Facelift ===
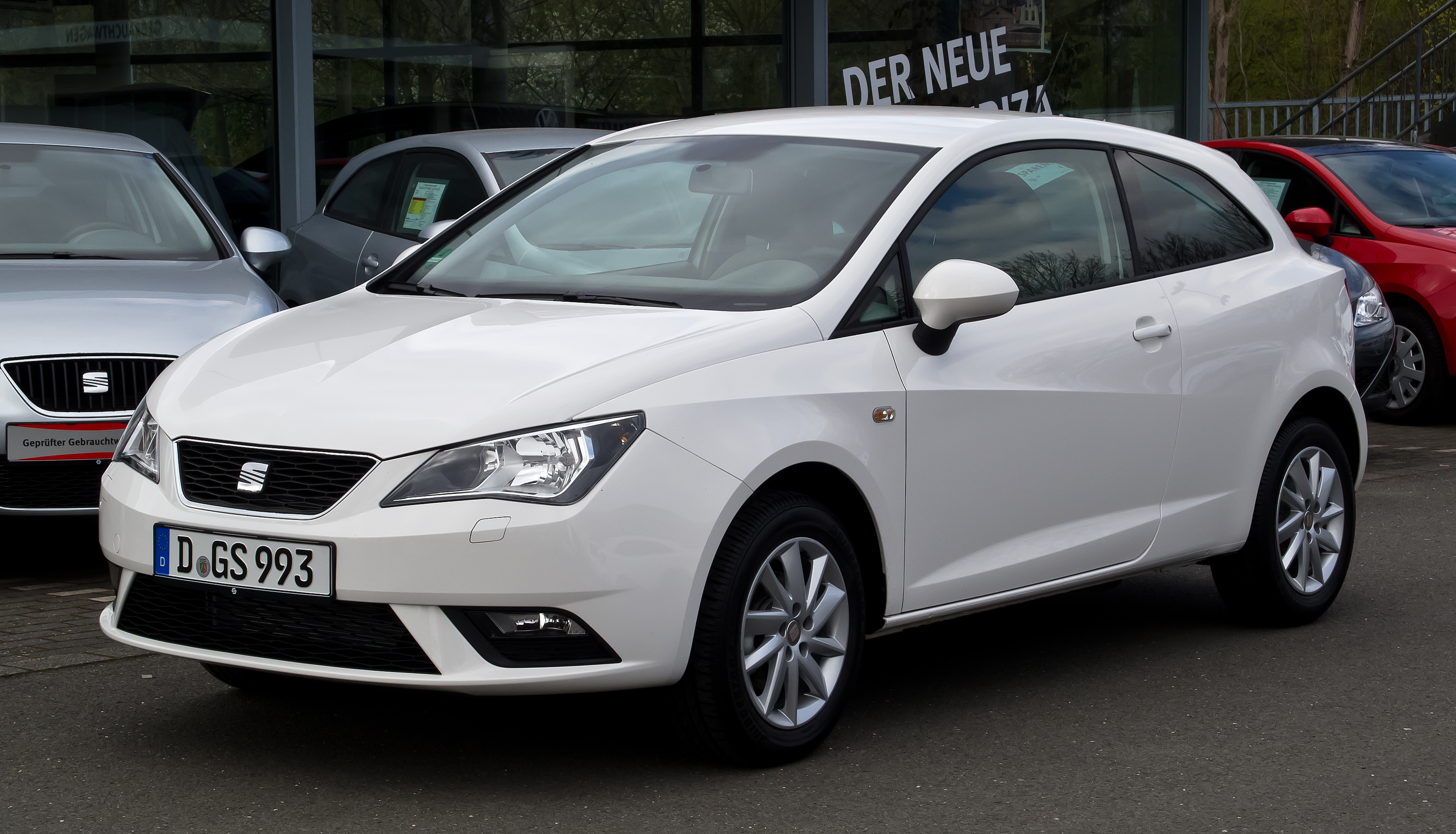
SEAT Ibiza Mk4 facelift, front view

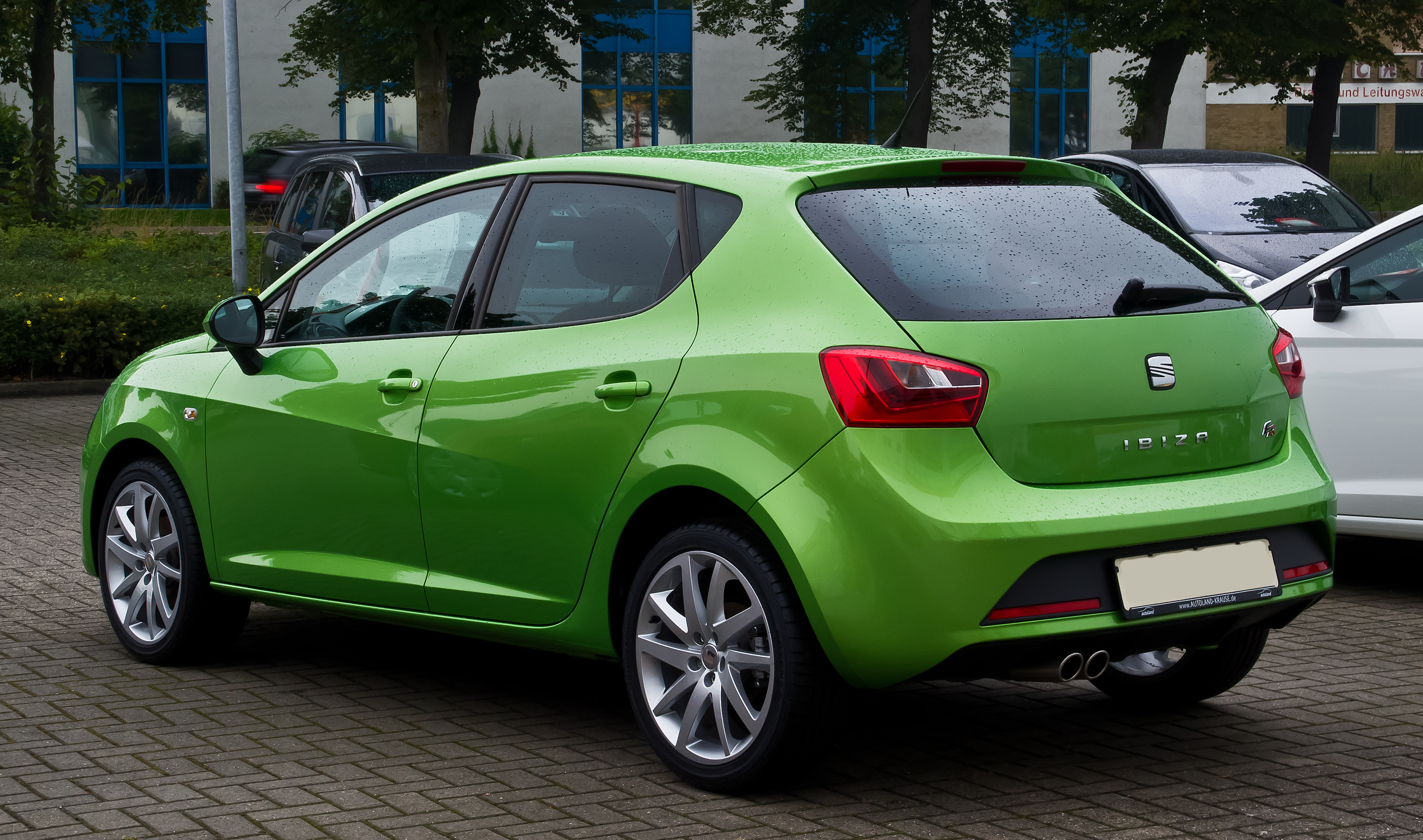
SEAT Ibiza Mk4 facelift, rear view

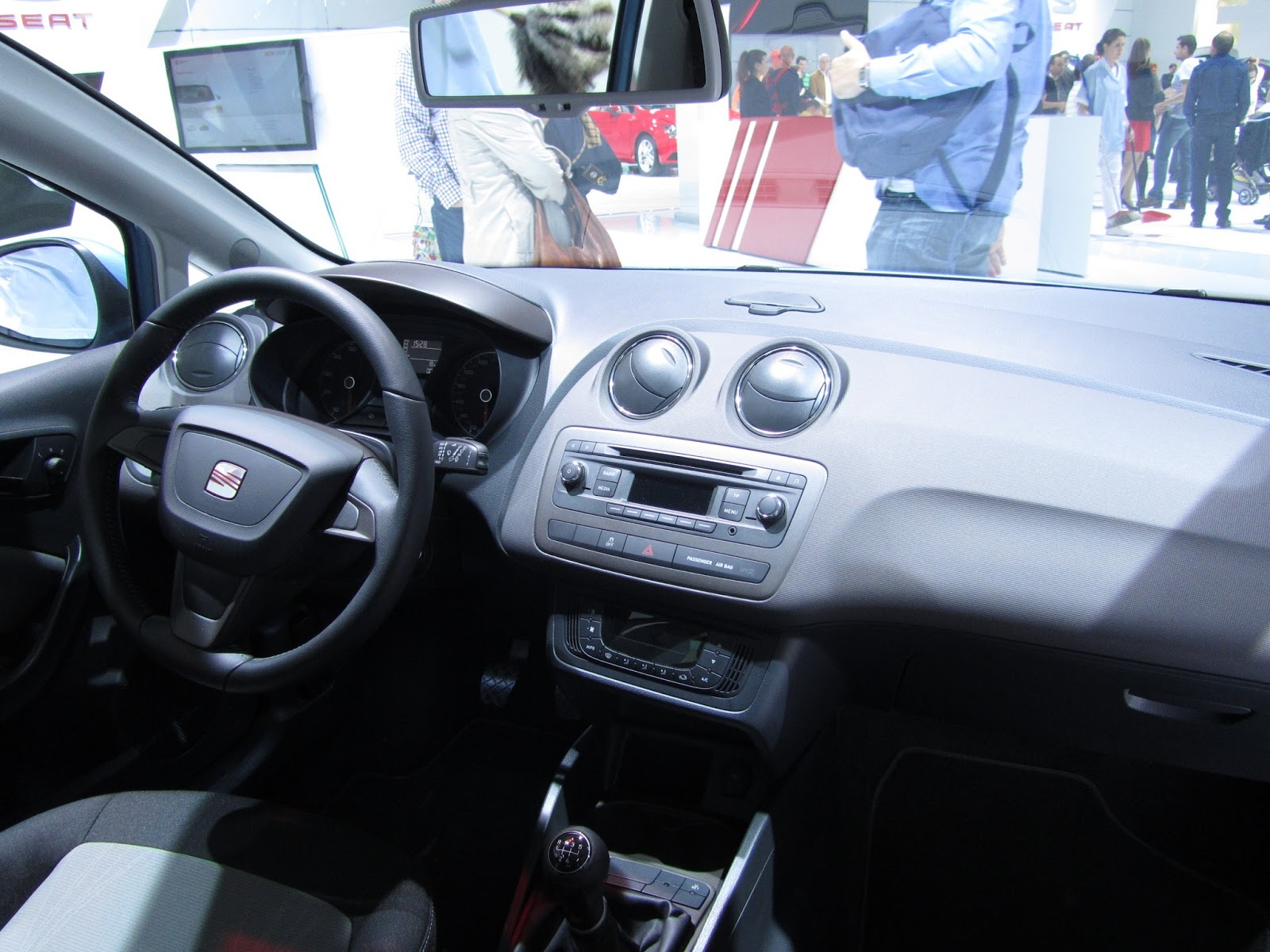
Interior

The facelift model was launched at the 2012 Geneva Motor Show, and sales began shortly thereafter. The facelift consisted of a light exterior and interior refresh.

=== Ibiza ST ===
A 5-door estate car variant, the Ibiza ST, was announced in March 2010, at the Geneva Motor Show.

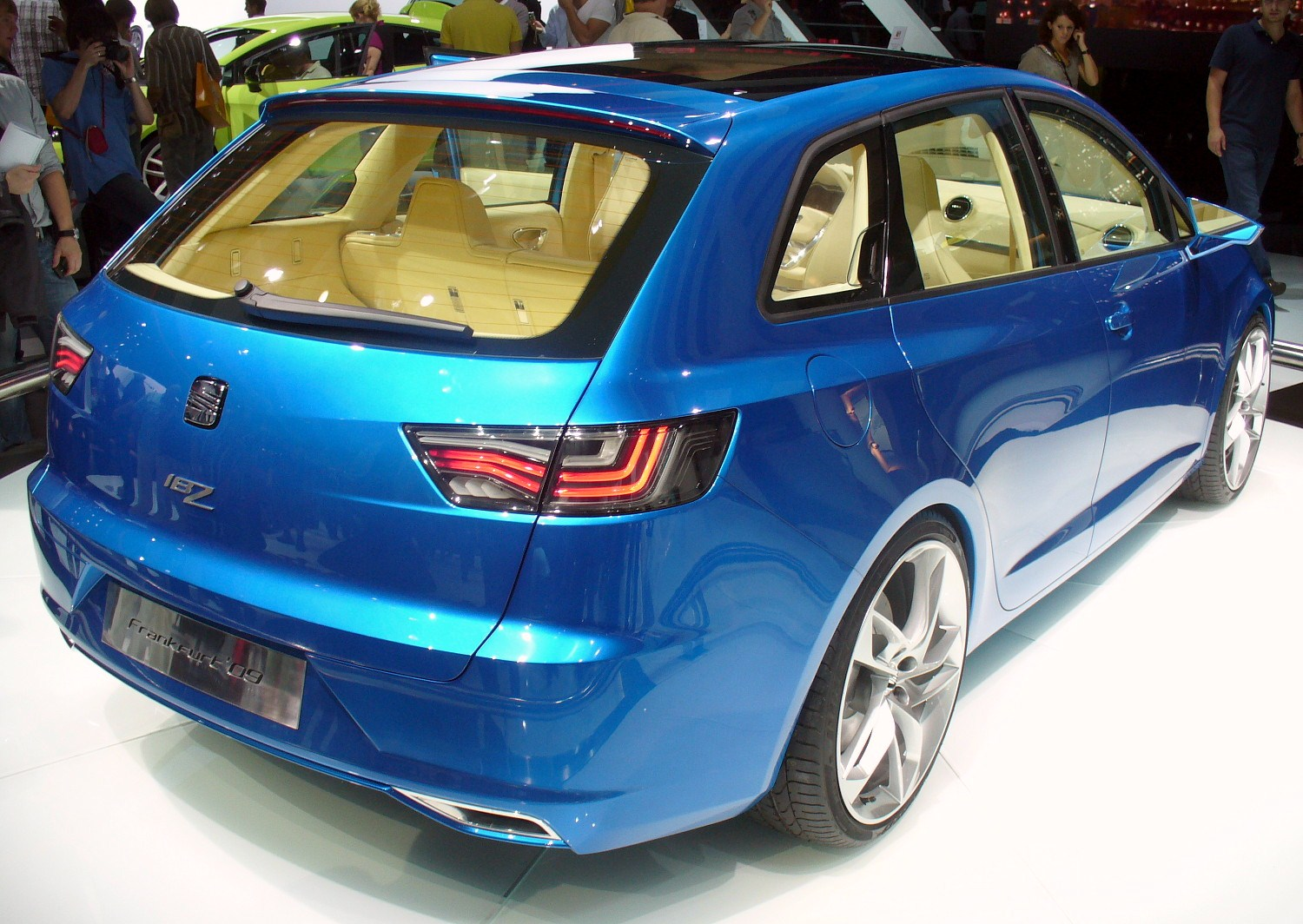
SEAT IBZ concept car

The preview of the Ibiza ST was shown at the 2009 Frankfurt Motor Show in the form of the IBZ concept car.

The Ibiza ST was 4.23 m (167 in) long, which increased the boot volume to 430 litres. Two new engine options were introduced with this model, a 105 PS 1.2-litre TSI (petrol) and a 75 PS 1.2-litre TDI diesel.

=== Ibiza CONNECT ===
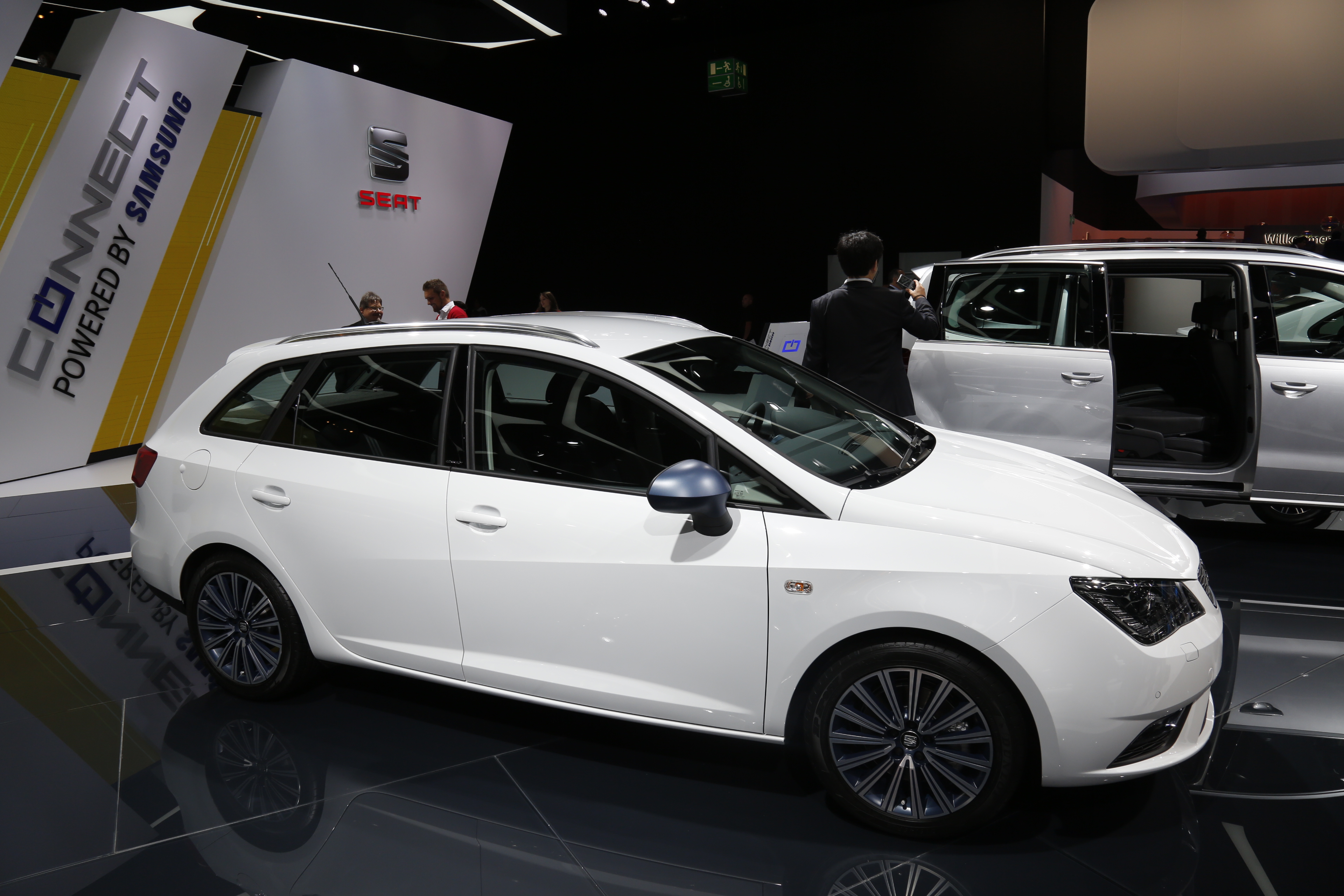
A white SEAT Ibiza CONNECT edition at the Frankfurt Motor Show

The CONNECT model was presented at the 2015 Frankfurt Motor Show and was equipped with Full Link connectivity technology and the SEAT ConnectApp. This app allowed the user's smartphone to be connected to the car's infotainment system and to use connectivity features. The SEAT Ibiza CONNECT had a range of exterior body colours that allowed the mirrors and wheels to be customised.

=== Engine specifications ===
Model	Displacement	Configuration	Valves	Max. power at rpm	Max. torque at rpm	Engine code	Production period
Petrol engines
1.2	1,198 cc	Inline-3 DOHC	12	60 PS (44 kW; 59 hp) / 5200	108 N⋅m (80 lb⋅ft) / 3000	BKV	5/2009–
1.2	1,198 cc	Inline-3 DOHC	12	70 PS (52 kW; 68hp) / 5500	112 N⋅m (83 lb⋅ft) / 2600-3200	BZG / CGPA	4/2008–
1.2 TSI (*)	1,197 cc	Inline-4 OHC	8	108 PS (72 kW; 106 hp / 5000	175 N⋅m (129 lb⋅ft) / 1550−4100	CBZB	3/2010–
1.2 TSI	1,197 cc	Inline-4 DOHC	16	90 PS (66 kW; 89 hp) / 4400-5400	160 N⋅m (118 lbf⋅ft) / 1400-3500	CJZC	2015-
1.4 (*)	1,390 cc	Inline-4 DOHC	16	86 PS (63 kW; 85 hp) / 5000	132 N⋅m (97 lb⋅ft) / 3800	BXW / CGG	4/2008–
1.4 TSI FR ACT	1,395 cc	Inline-4 DOHC	16	140 PS (103 kW; 138 hp) / 4500-6000	250 N⋅m (184 lbf⋅ft) / 1500−3500	CAVF	5/2009–
1.4 TSI FR	1,390 cc	Inline-4 DOHC	16	150 PS (110 kW; 148 hp) / 5800	220 N⋅m (162 lbf⋅ft) / 1250−4500	CAVF	5/2009–
1.4 TSI Cupra	1,390 cc	Inline-4 DOHC	16	180 PS (132 kW; 178 hp) / 6200	250 N⋅m (184 lbf⋅ft) / 2000−4500	CAVE/CTHE	5/2009–11/2015
1.6	1,598 cc	Inline-4 DOHC	16	105 PS (77 kW; 104 hp) / 5600	153 N⋅m (113 lb⋅ft) / 3800	BTS	4/2008–04/2010
1.6 LPG Bifuel	1,598 cc	Inline-4 DOHC	16	81 PS (60 kW; 80 hp)/ 4000−6000	145 N⋅m (107 lb⋅ft) / 3800	CNKA	05/2011 –
1.8 TSI Cupra	1,798 cc	Inline-4 DOHC	16	192 PS (141 kW; 189 hp) / 6200	320 N⋅m (236 lbf⋅ft) / 1450-4200	DAJA	11/2015–
2.0 (Mexico)	1,984 cc	Inline-4 OHC	8	115 PS (85 kW; 113 hp) / 5200	170 N⋅m (125 lbf⋅ft) / 2400	CEKA	
Diesel engines
1.2 TDI CR DPF (*)	1,199 cc	Inline-3 DOHC	12	75 PS (55 kW; 74 hp) / 4200	180 N⋅m (133 lbf⋅ft) / 1500–3450	CFWA	5/2010–
1.4 TDI PD DPF	1,422 cc	Inline-3 OHC	6	80 PS (59 kW; 79 hp) / 4000	195 N⋅m (144 lb⋅ft) / 2200	BMS	4/2008–4/2010
1.6 TDI CR DPF (*)	1,598 cc	Inline-4 DOHC	16	90 PS (66 kW; 89 hp) / 4200	230 N⋅m (170 lbf⋅ft) / 1500–2500	CAYB	5/2009–12/2015
1.6 TDI CR DPF (*)	1,598 cc	Inline-4 DOHC	16	105 PS (77 kW; 104 hp) / 4400	250 N⋅m (184 lbf⋅ft) / 1500–2500	CAYC	10/2009–12/2015
1.9 TDI PD DPF	1,896 cc	Inline-4 OHC	8	90 PS (66 kW; 89 hp) / 4000	210 N⋅m (155 lbf⋅ft) / 1800–2500	BXJ	4/2008–5/2009
1.9 TDI PD DPF	1,896 cc	Inline-4 OHC	8	105 PS (77 kW; 104 hp) / 4000	240 N⋅m (177 lbf⋅ft) / 1900	BLS	4/2008–5/2009
2.0 TDI FR CR DPF	1,968 cc	Inline-4 DOHC	16	143 PS (105 kW; 141 hp) / 4200	320 N⋅m (236 lbf⋅ft) / 1750–2500	CFHD	10/2009–12/2015

Note: (*) Also fitted on the Ibiza ST

=== Safety ===
In 2008, the SEAT Ibiza Mk4 was tested for its safety performance under the Euro NCAP assessment scheme and it achieved a 5-star overall rating:

Overall rating	5/5 stars
Adult occupant	5/5 stars
Child occupant	4.5/5 stars
Pedestrian	3.8/5 stars

In 2011, the SEAT Ibiza Mk4 was tested for its safety performance under the Euro NCAP assessment scheme and it achieved a 5-star overall rating:

=== Second facelift ===
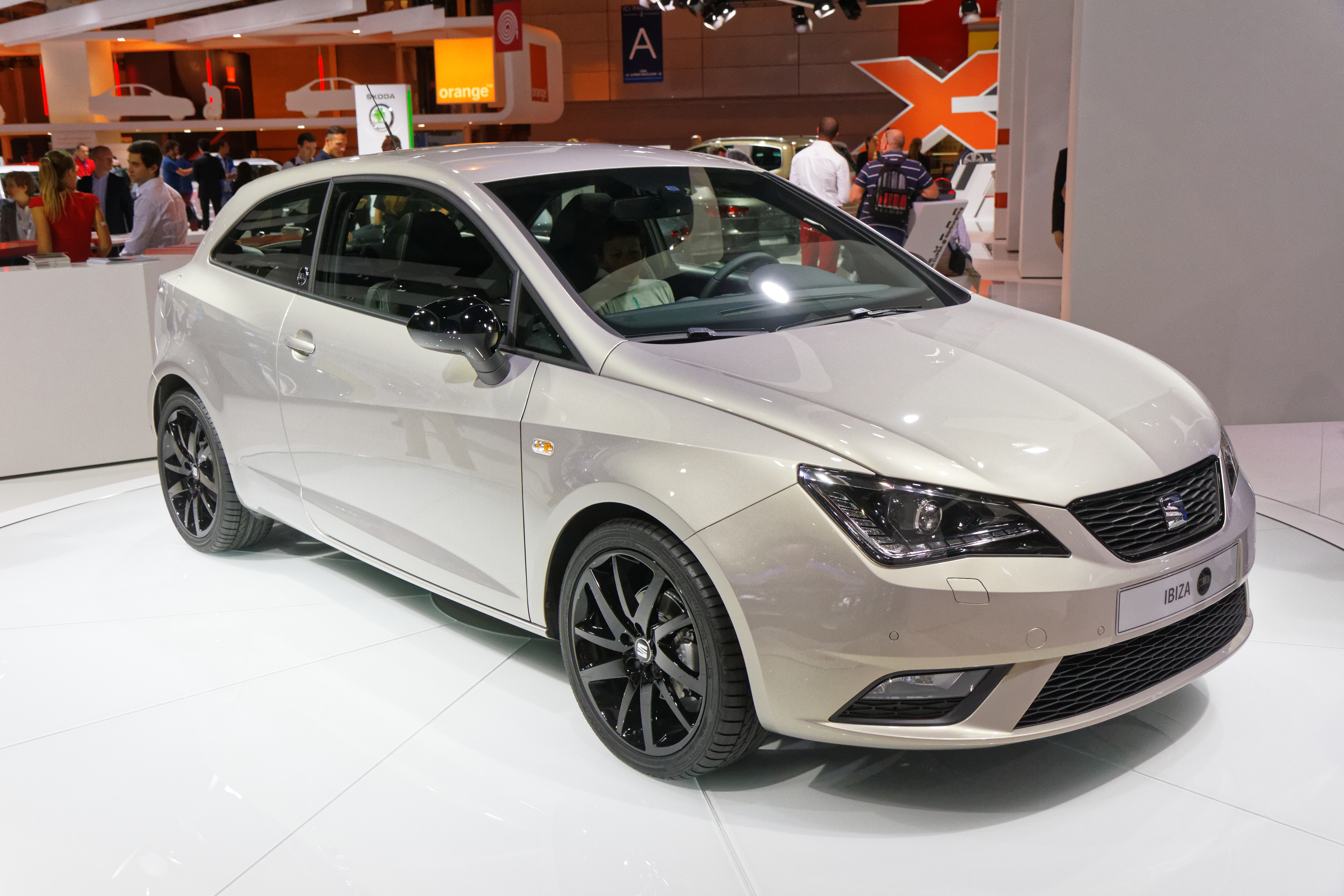
The 2015 SEAT Ibiza

The Ibiza received a second, more thorough facelift in 2015. The interior as well as the exterior were changed. According to SEAT, the interior raw materials used were higher in quality, and the overall design was more driver-focused and ergonomic. It was possible to personalise the steering wheel, gear stick, air vents, radio buttons, and door handles with a range of available colours. The centre console was more accessible and there were multiple new technology additions. It was equipped with a multifunctional steering wheel, ambient lighting, and an integrated navigation system along with Full Link technology. The Full Link technology allowed connectivity with the driver's mobile phone in a safe and easy way. Mirror Link technology, through the second-generation MIB infotainment system, also replicated the smartphone screen when a compatible device was plugged in. Full Link was also compatible with both Android and Apple smartphones.

The safety features included were: daytime full-LED lights, parking assist with audio warnings, and a rear-view camera which provides live video from the rear of the car to make the driver aware of obstacles when reversing.

Externally, the biggest difference was full LED lights. It was available as a 5-door, sport coupé, and sport tourer, as with the previous Ibiza. A range of Volkswagen Group's new 1.0-litre three-cylinder engines (MPI and TSI) were also available with the facelifted Ibiza.

== Fifth generation (6F/KJ1; 2017) ==
SEAT Ibiza Mk5
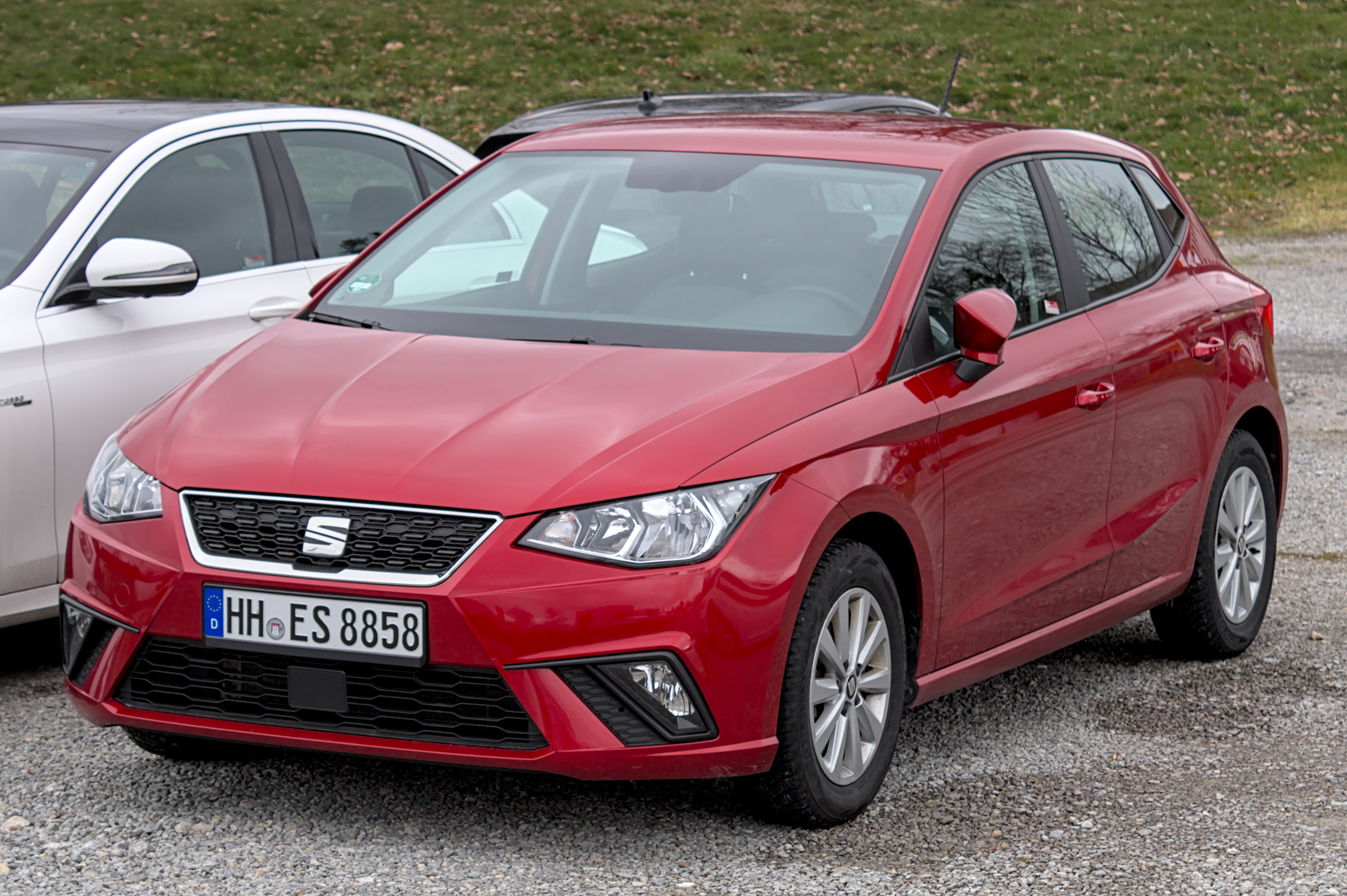

Overview
- Model code: 6F
- Production: 2017–present
- Assembly: Spain: Martorell, Catalonia; Algeria: Relizane
- Designer: Julio Lozano

Body and chassis
- Body style: 5-door hatchback
- Platform: Volkswagen Group MQB A0
- Related: SEAT Arona; Volkswagen Polo; Audi A1; Škoda Fabia

Powertrain
- Engine: petrol: 1.0 L I3; 1.0 L TSI I3; 1.0 L TGI I3; 1.5 L TSI I4; 1.6 L I4; diesel: 1.6 L TDI I4
- Transmission: 5/6-speed manual 7-speed DSG

Dimensions
- Wheelbase: 2,564 mm (100.9 in)
- Length: 4,059 mm (159.8 in) (5-door)
- Width: 1,780 mm (70.1 in)
- Height: 1,444 mm (56.9 in) (5-door)

The fifth-generation SEAT Ibiza 5-door hatchback (Type 6F) was introduced at the 2017 Geneva Motor Show. It was based on the MQB A0 platform. It was 2 mm shorter and 87 mm wider than the preceding generation, and it was the first vehicle in the VAG group to use the MQB A0 platform, before the VW Polo, Skoda Fabia, and the Audi A1. Engine options included the 1.0-litre MPi, 1.0-litre TSI 3-cylinder petrol, 1.0-litre TSI 3-cylinder CNG, 1.5-litre TSI EVO, and the 1.6-litre TDI four-cylinder diesel.

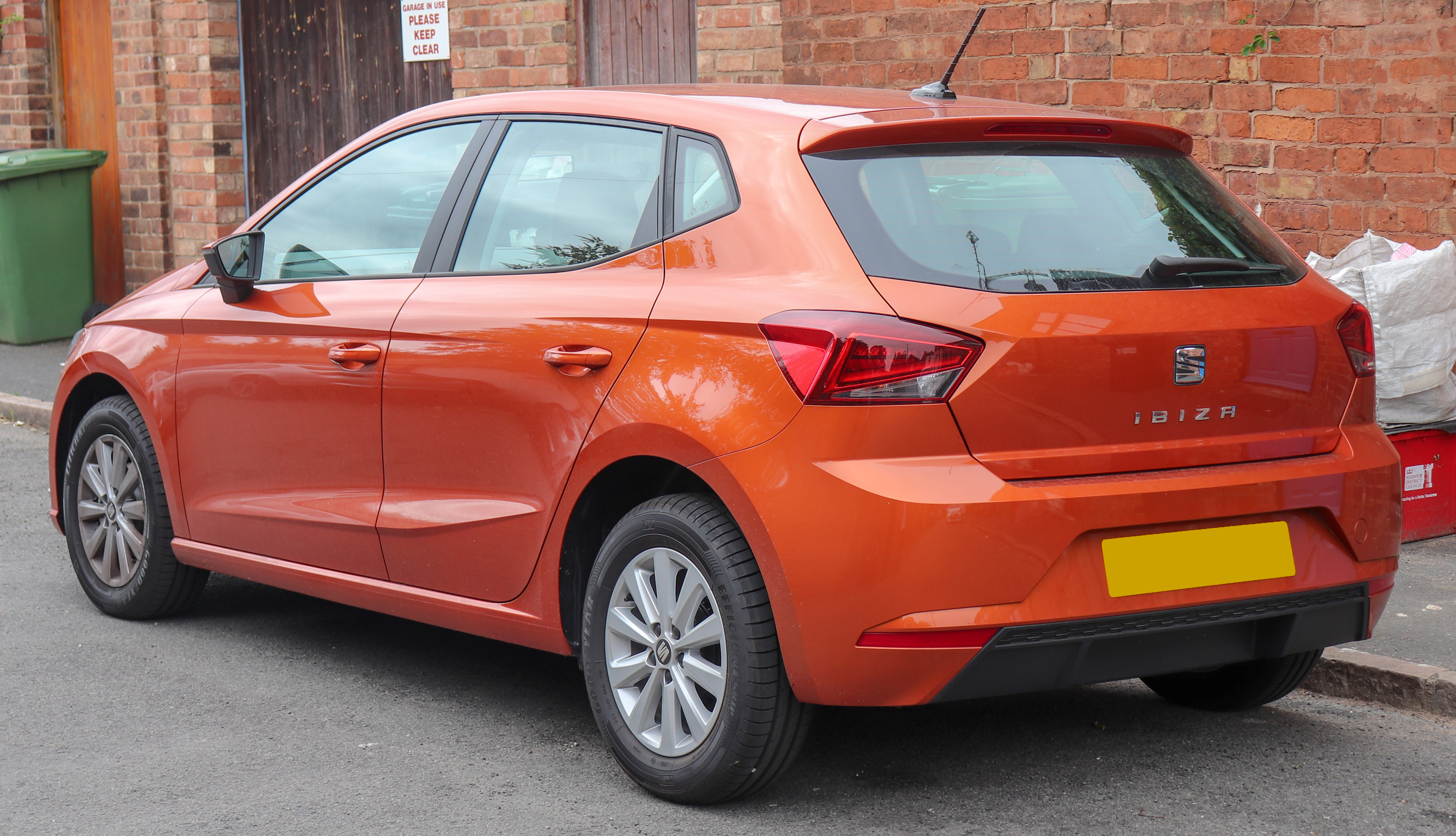
Rear view (pre-facelift)

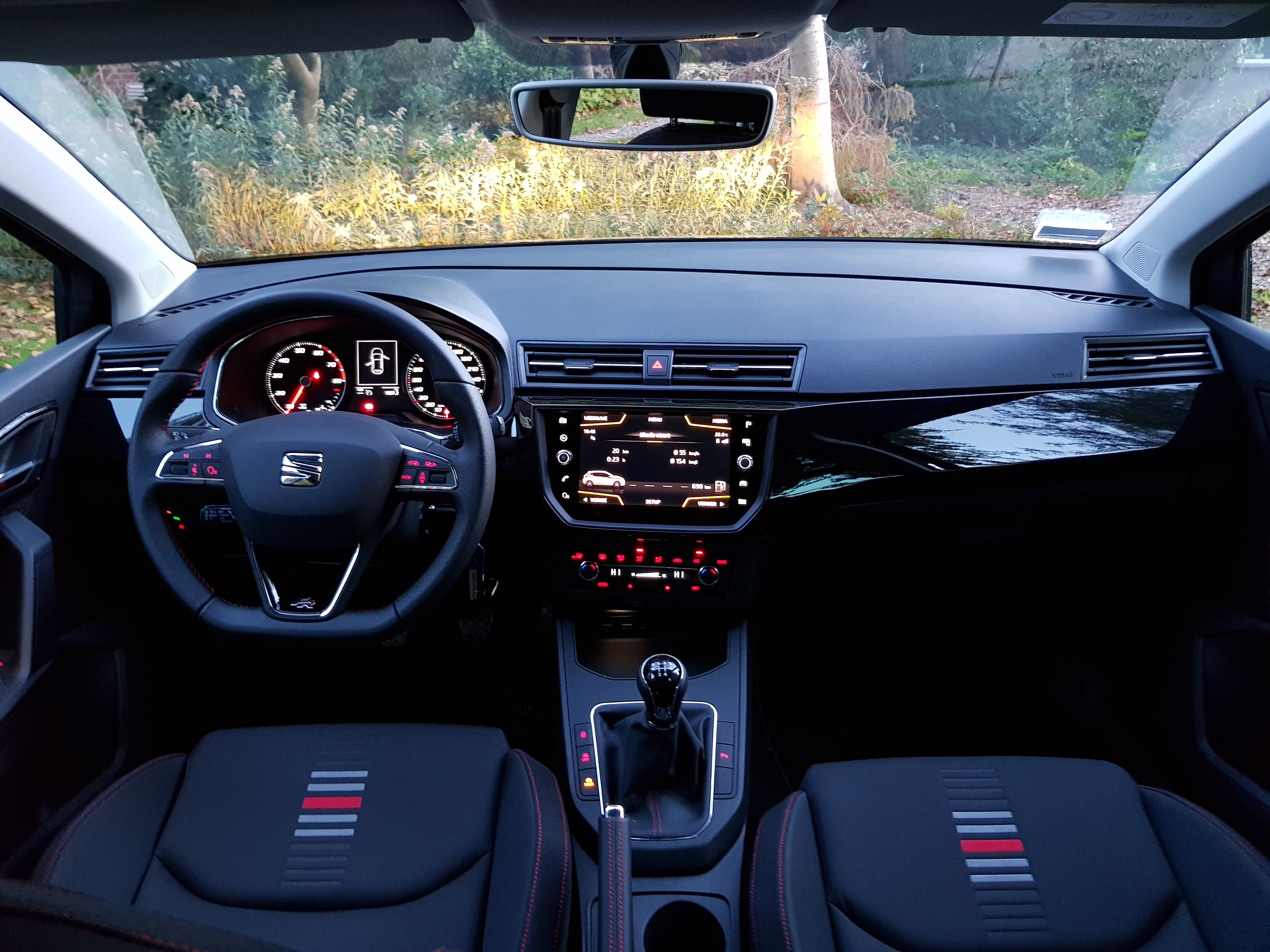
Interior (pre-facelift)

=== Facelift (2021) ===
The facelifted SEAT Ibiza was revealed on 15 April 2021. There were minimal changes made for the exterior styling, but the interior received a number of changes such as a larger-sized screen of the touchscreen infotainment system, newly designed steering wheel and the inclusion of soft-touch materials on dashboard.

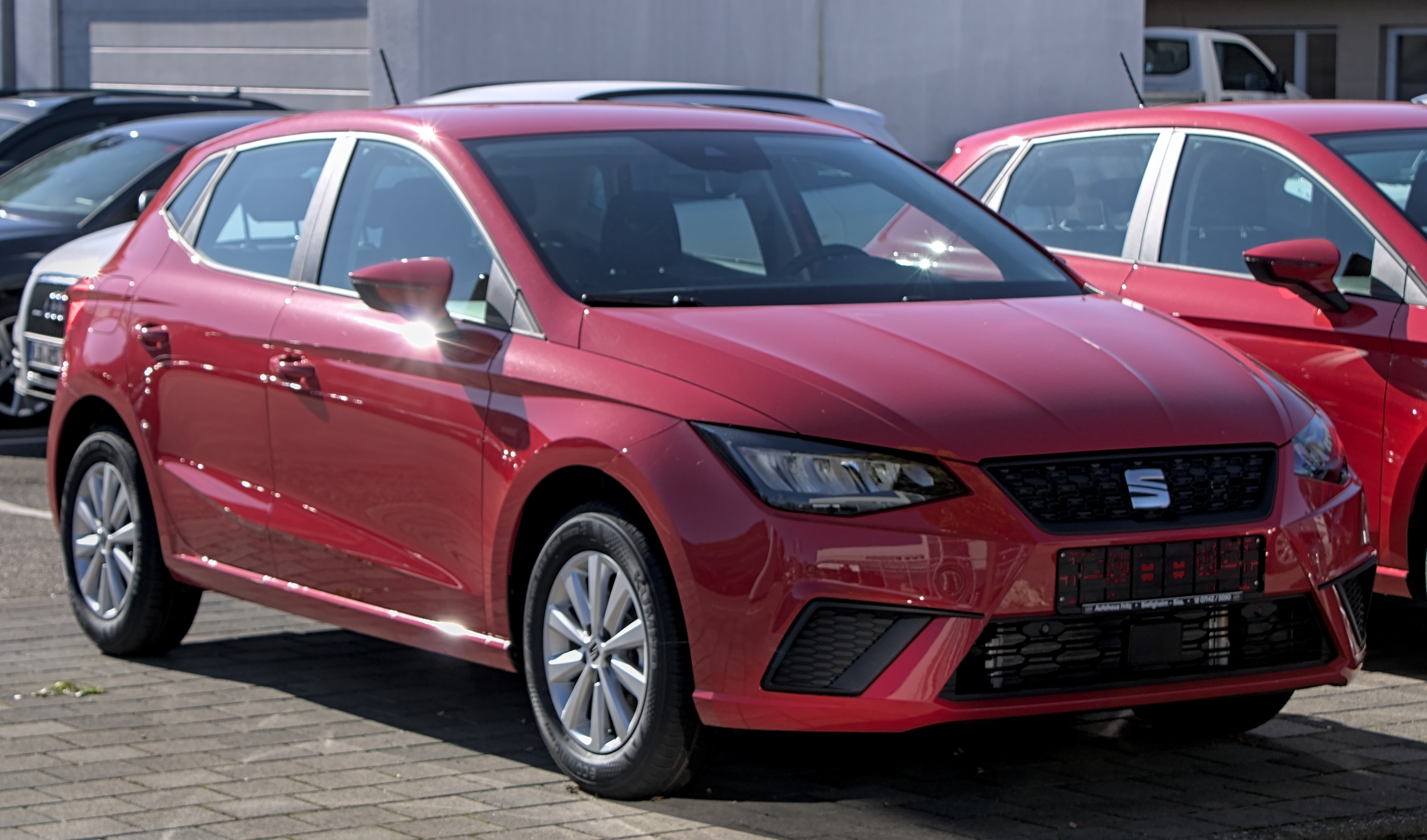
Front view (facelift)

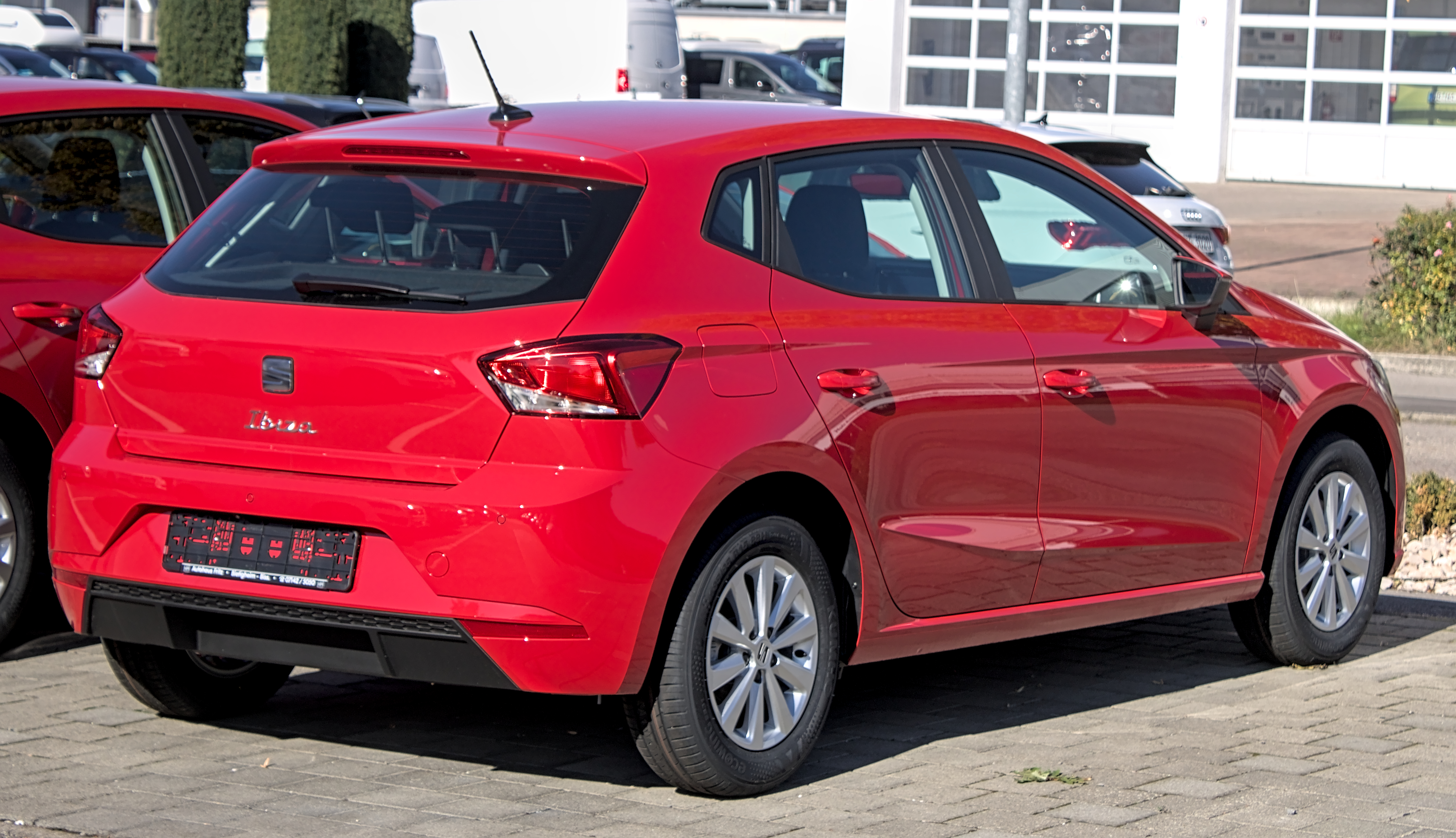
Rear view (facelift)

=== Second facelift (2025) ===
The fifth-generation Ibiza received a second facelift in October 2025, with redesigned lights and bumpers, as well as SEAT's new grille design, including hexagonal elements.

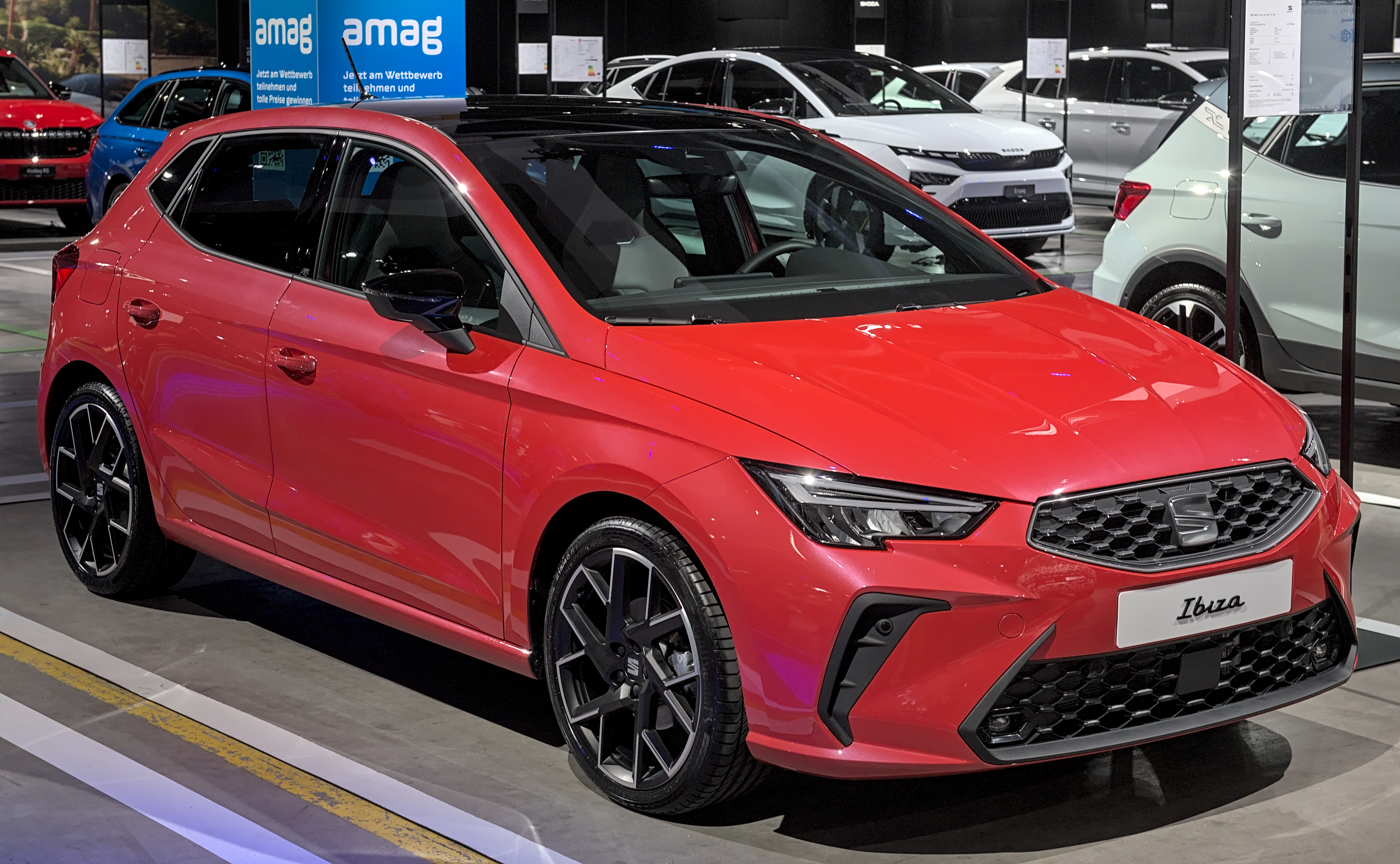
Front view

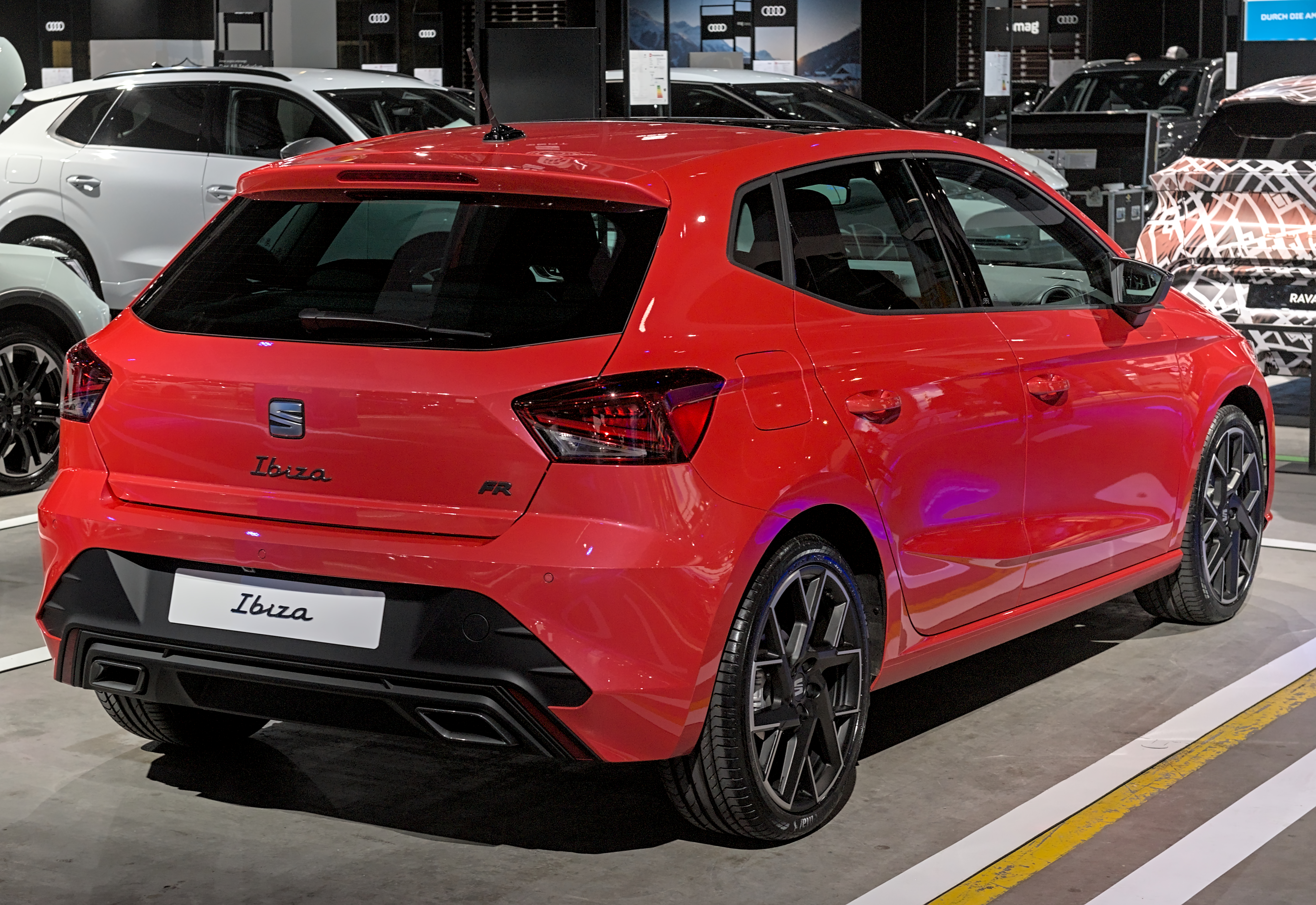
Rear view

=== Safety ===
==== Euro NCAP ====
Euro NCAP test results* SEAT Ibiza 1.0 TSI Style (LHD) (2017)
Test	Points	%
Overall:	5 /5 stars	
Adult occupant:	36.1	95%
Child occupant:	37.8	77%
Pedestrian:	32	76%
Safety assist:	7.3	60%

==== Latin NCAP ====
In 2018, the updated Spanish-built Ibiza in its most basic Latin American market configuration received 5 stars for adult occupants and 5 stars for child occupants from Latin NCAP 2.0.

Latin NCAP 2.0 test results Seat Ibiza + 6 Airbags (from 01/09/2018) (2018, based on Euro NCAP 2008)
Test	Points	Stars
Adult occupant:	30.44/34.0	5 /5 stars
Child occupant:	41.64/49.00	5 /5 stars

== Motorsport ==
Rallying

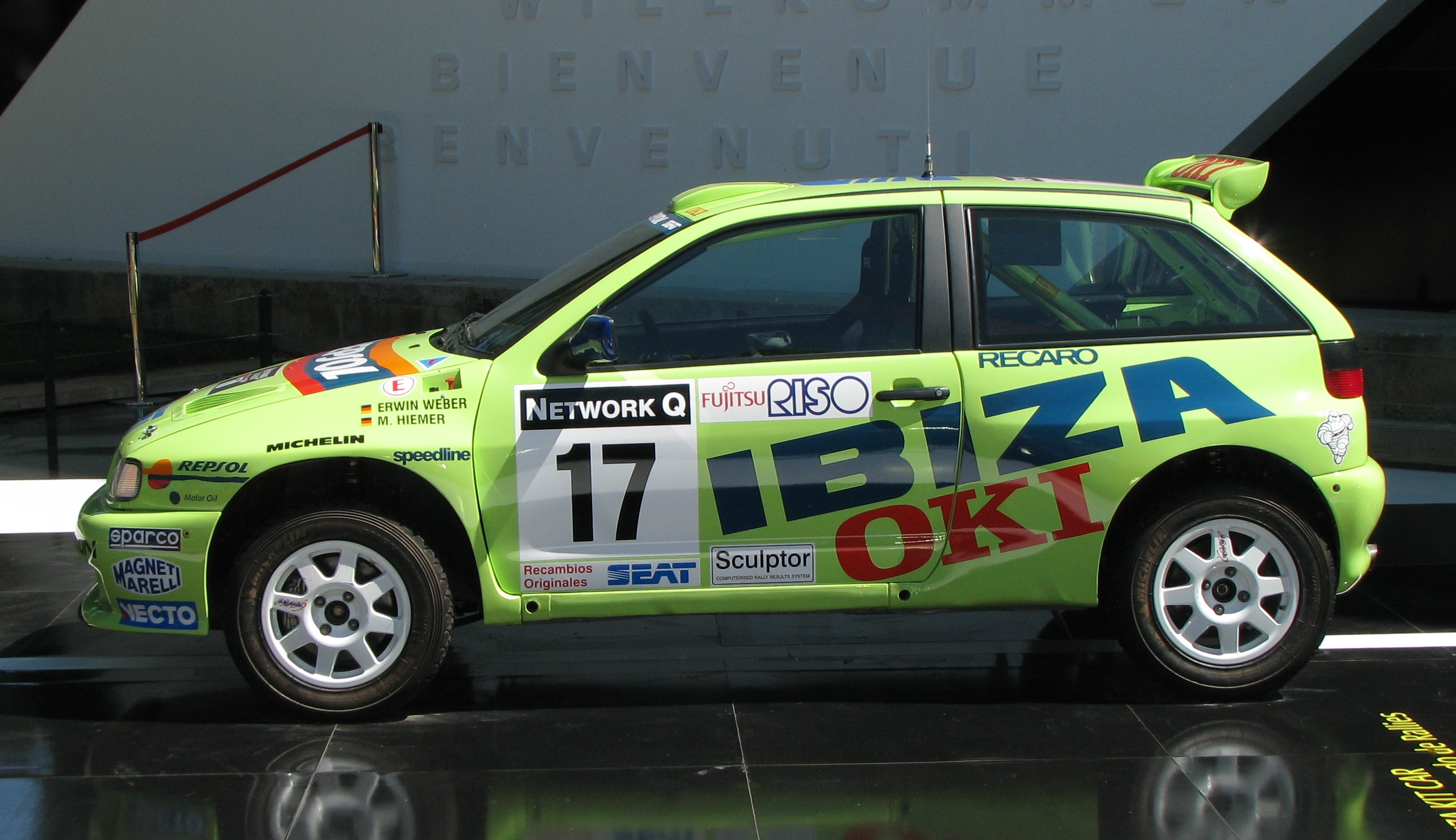
Erwin Weber's SEAT Ibiza Kit car

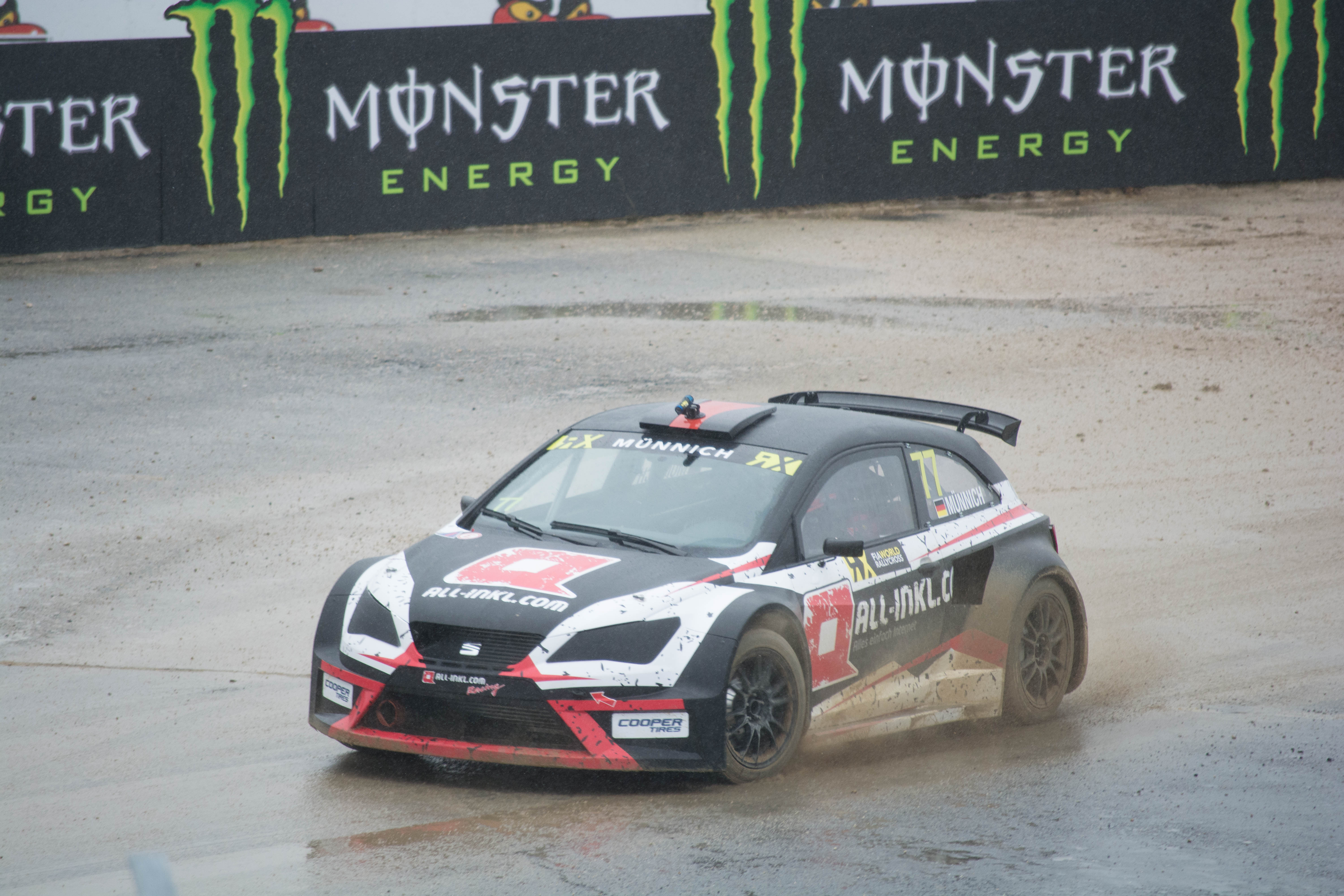
René Münnich driving an Ibiza (Fourth generation) in the 2016 World RX of Portugal

SEAT was not involved in the World Rally Championship after the 1977 season, until 1995, when, after an 18-year gap, they returned with a second-generation Ibiza 1.8-litre 16v driven by Erwin Weber in the Rally of Portugal, in the two-wheel-drive category. That same year, Weber won first place in the two-wheel-drive category in the Acropolis Rally, with Antonio Rius in second place. The Copa Ibiza 16V also made its debut that year. The successes of the 1995 season encouraged SEAT to participate the following year in the World Rally Championship in the 2.0-litre engine category, with the SEAT Ibiza Kit Car, a decision which proved to be successful as SEAT won the 1996 FIA 2-Litre World Rally Cup title, becoming the first brand to win the world title in its debut year. SEAT Sport in the next two seasons reaffirmed its domination, winning 2.0-litre WRC championship titles in 1997 and 1998, with drivers Harri Rovanperä, Oriol Gómez, Toni Gardemeister, Jörgen Jonasson, and Gwyndaf Evans.

Rallycross

The fourth-generation Ibiza were made by Münnich Motorsport to compete in the RX1 class (Until 2020 named as Supercar) of the FIA World Rallycross Championship. The cars made its debut at the 2016 World RX of Portugal, with its best finish was third place by Timo Scheider at the opening round of the 2020 season. The cars were made and developed without direct support from SEAT.

One of the Ibiza RX1 was converted to electric-spec RX1e to compete in the 2023 FIA World Rallycross Championship.

== Reliability ==
Reliability has been mixed. Auto Bild endurance tests from 2011 showed the Ibiza had achieved not only the "best result of any car in the VW Group" but also the "best result for a small car in the history of the AutoBild 100,000 km endurance tests". Warranty Direct lists the Ibiza name among the UK's 100 most reliable cars despite recent generations scoring poorly, with SEAT ranked 26th of 40 manufacturers overall.

== Sales ==
Since the first generation of the SEAT Ibiza launched in 1984, more than four million SEAT Ibiza cars had been sold as of 2011.

Model year	Ibiza Mk1	Ibiza Mk2	Ibiza Mk3
Years	1984–1993	1993–2002	2002–2007
Total sales	1,342,001	1,522,607	1,084,989

In the year 2009, the total annual retail sales number of SEAT Ibiza cars was 170,833 vehicles, while the annual production of SEAT Ibiza vehicles made in SEAT's Martorell plant was 173,715 units.

The total production per year of SEAT Ibiza cars, manufactured in SEAT and other Volkswagen group's plants, is shown in the following table:

Model year	1986	1987	1988	1989	1990	1991	1992	1993	1994	1995	1996	1997	1998	1999	2000	2001	2002
Total annual production	121,526	160,907	192,024	208,210	202,157	173,236	112,334	142,987	140,974	158,284	153,000	168,492	180,775	194,245	199,279	188,427	197,311
Model year	2003	2004	2005	2006	2007	2008	2009	2010	2011	2012	2013	2014	2015	2016	2017	2018	2019
Total annual production	220,497	183,754	168,645	183,848	172,206	192,470	173,715	189,083	191,183	160,887	145,041	153,633	160,451	149,988	160,377	120,287	130,243
Model year	2020	2021	2022	2023	2024	2025											
Total annual production	74,564	83,710	60,385	74,355	108,058	95,676											

== See also ==
- Ecomotive
