= 1128 (disambiguation) =

1128 may also refer to:

- 1128 (number), a number in the 1000s range
- AD 1128 (MCXXVIII), a year in the Common Era
- 1128 BC, the year before the common era
- Highway 1128, several roads and highways
- 1128 Astrid, asteroid #1128, the 1128th asteroid registered, an asteroid in the Main Belt
- M1128 mobile gun system (model 1128 MGS) a U.S. Army gun vehicle based on a modified Stryker
- XM1128 (experimental model 1128) a 155mm boosted artillery round, a variant of the 1128 munition
- USS Conestoga (SP-1128), pennant SP-1128, numbered 1128, a WWI U.S.Navy ocean-going tug

== See also ==
- United Nations Security Council Resolution 1128
- DOI 10.1128, a prefix for microbiology
- B.1.1.28, a variant of the COVID-19 SARS-CoV-2 virus that was predominant in Brazil in the second half of 2020
- Il-28 (disambiguation) (ie. Il28)
- 128 (disambiguation)
