= SEAT Málaga =

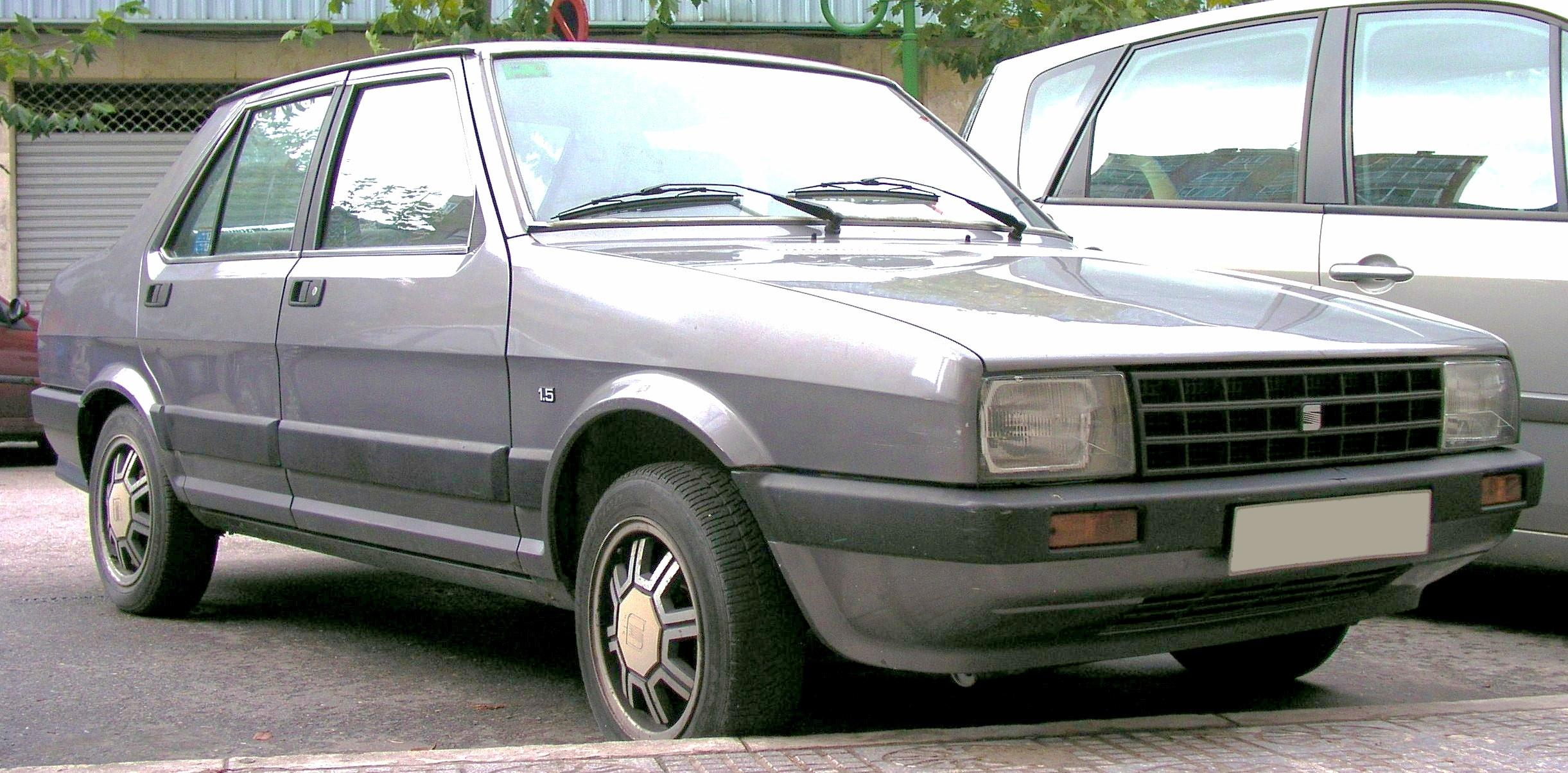
- SEAT Málaga GLX (pre-facelift)

Overview
- Manufacturer: SEAT
- Also called: SEAT Gredos (Greece)
- Production: 1985–1991
- Assembly: Spain: Barcelona (Zona Franca)
- Designer: Giorgetto Giugiaro at Italdesign

Body and chassis
- Class: Small family car (C)
- Body style: 4-door saloon
- Related: SEAT Ritmo; SEAT Ronda; SEAT Ibiza; Fiat Ritmo; Fiat Regata

Powertrain
- Engine: 1.2 L I4; 1.5 L I4; 1.7 L I4 (diesel)
- Transmission: 5-speed manual

Chronology
- Predecessor: SEAT 131
- Successor: SEAT Córdoba; SEAT Toledo

The SEAT Málaga (codenamed 023A) is a four-door saloon produced by the Spanish automaker SEAT from 1985 to 1991 and named after the city of Málaga in Andalucía in southern Spain.

Although it can be considered a saloon variant of the SEAT Ibiza, both the Málaga and the first generation Ibiza were based upon those underpinnings of the SEAT Ronda.

== Overview ==
The Málaga was a restyled version of the SEAT Ronda, a heavy facelifted version of the SEAT Ritmo, which in its turn was the rebadged version of the Fiat Ritmo. The Málaga most closely resembled the Fiat Regata, which was Fiat’s own saloon version of the hatchback Fiat Ritmo. However, the SEAT Málaga and the Fiat Regata were developed separately as the two manufacturers had already ended their partnership by the time of the launch of their two saloon models.

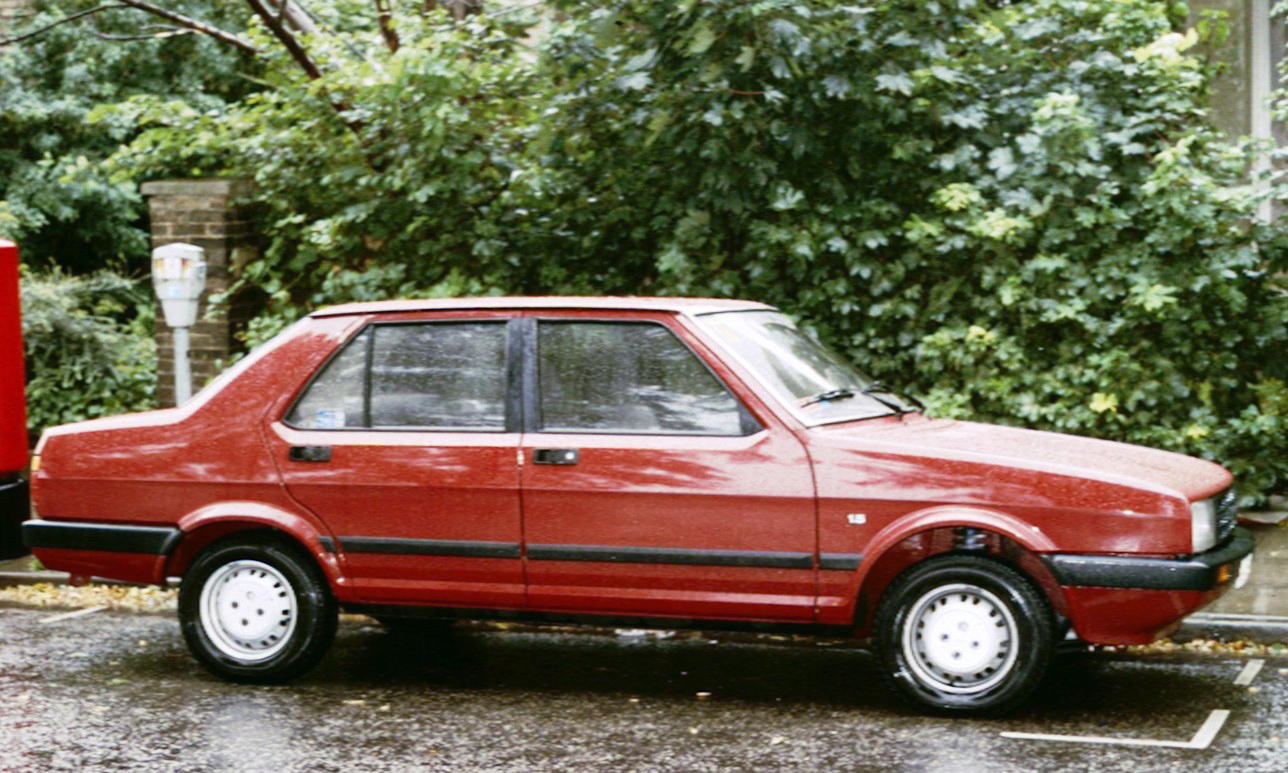
1985 SEAT Málaga 1.5 (pre-facelift)

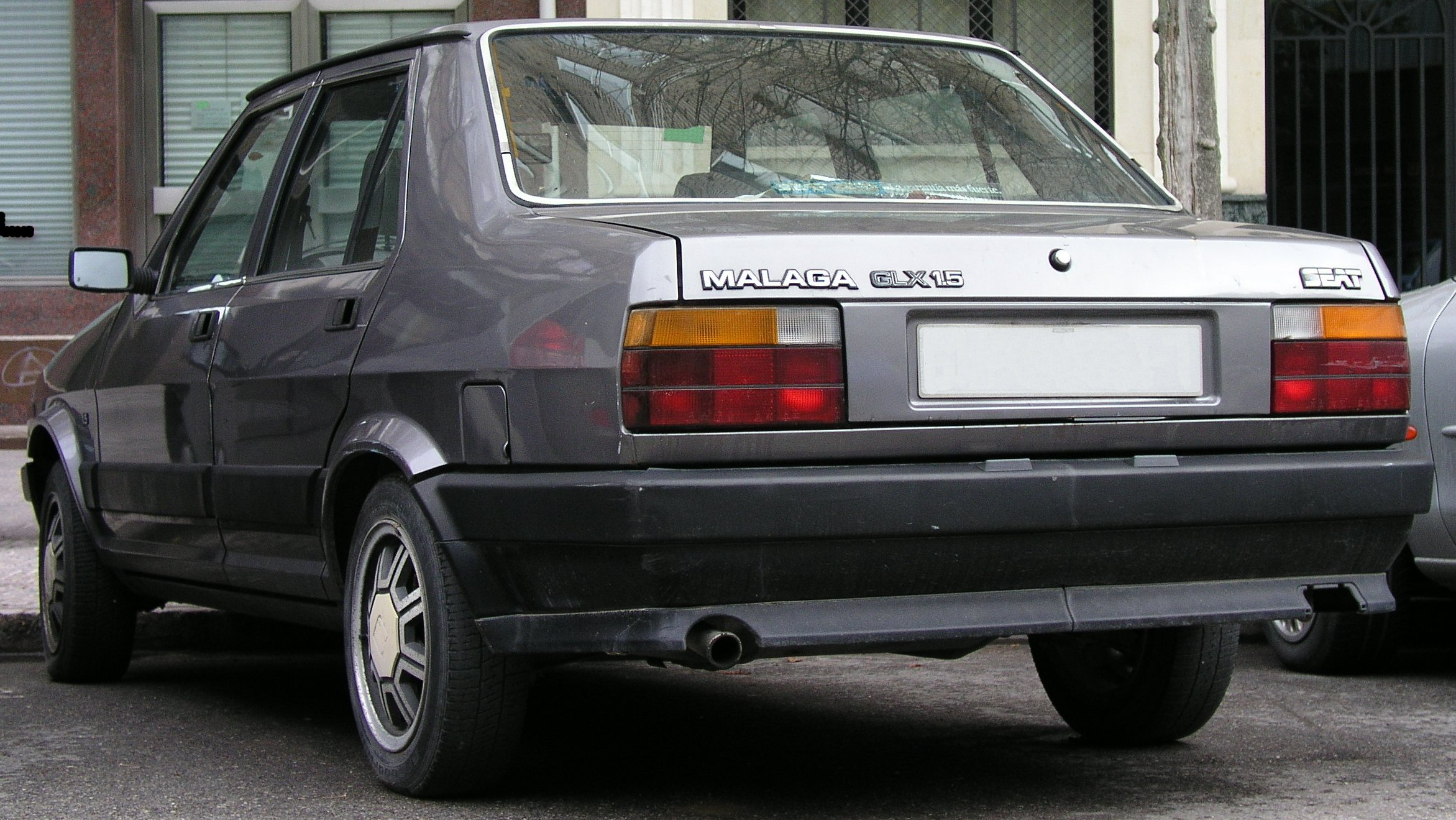
Rear view (pre-facelift)

=== Facelifts ===
In 1987 it received a minor redesign that affected the front grille, replacing its checkered pattern with one featuring horizontal lines.

In 1989, to extend the model's lifespan until a successor arrived, it was decided that the Málaga would receive a minor facelift. This consisted of changes to the lower bumpers, different side moldings, a grille painted in the body color with a recess for the new SEAT logo, and some minor interior tweaks.

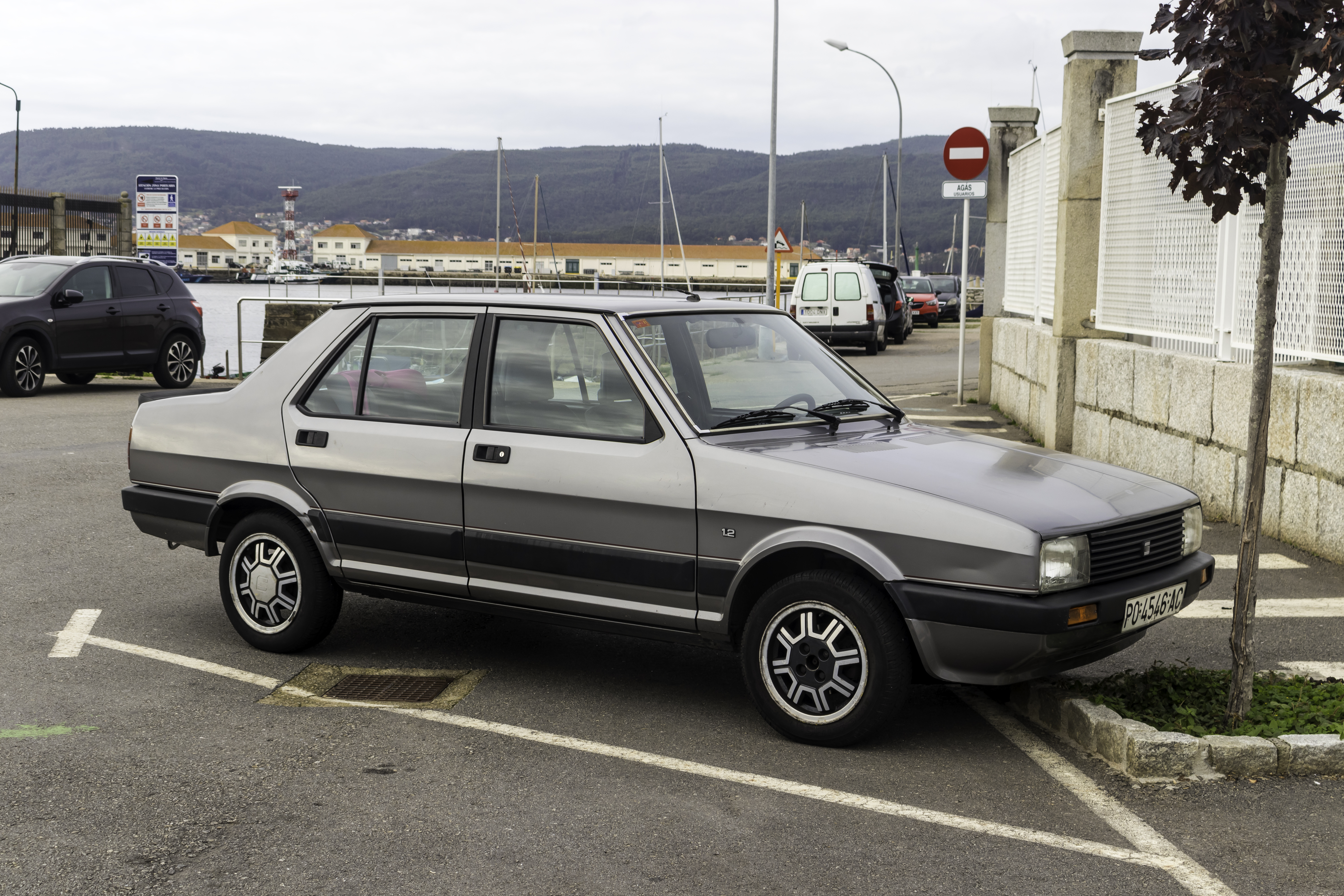
SEAT Málaga GLX (first facelift)

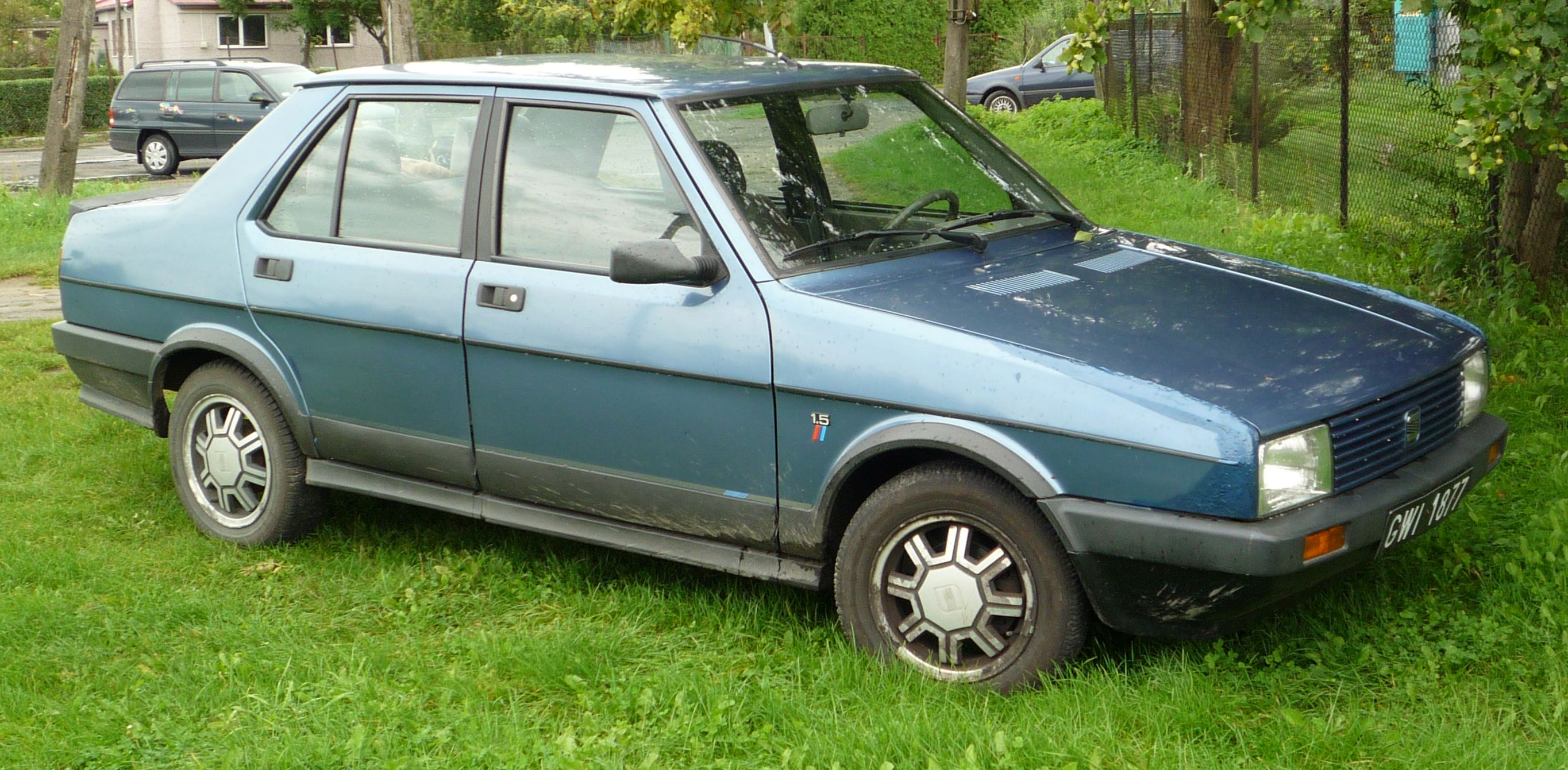
SEAT Málaga GLX 1.5 (second facelift)

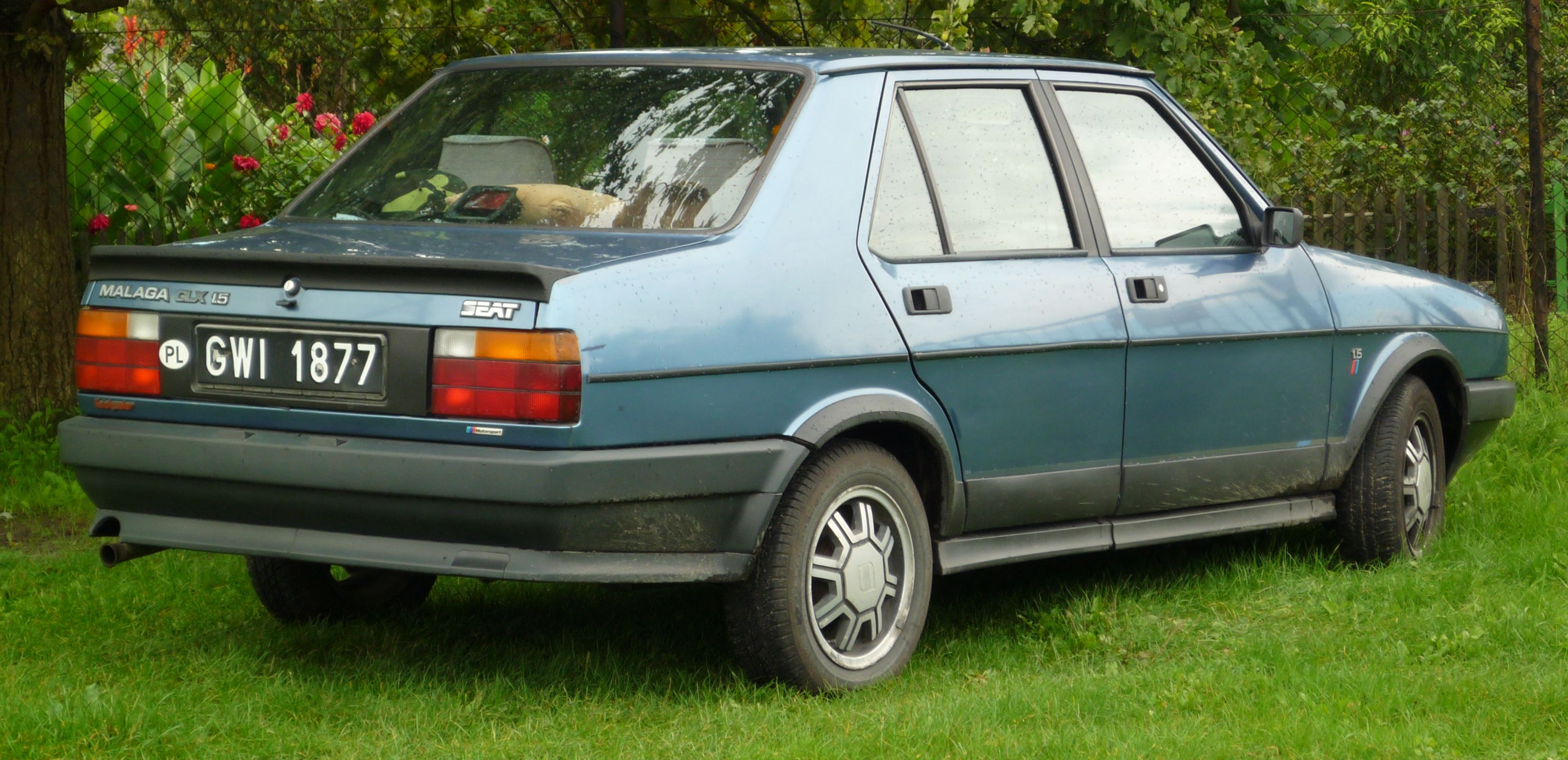
Rear view (second facelift)

Production ended in May 1991, by which time SEAT had been taken over by the Volkswagen Group. The car was replaced by the SEAT Toledo, the first Volkswagen-developed car from SEAT. The saloon based on the Ibiza, the SEAT Córdoba, was launched in end of 1993. A total of 196,929 units were built by SEAT between 1985 and 1991.

== Export markets ==
=== Greece ===
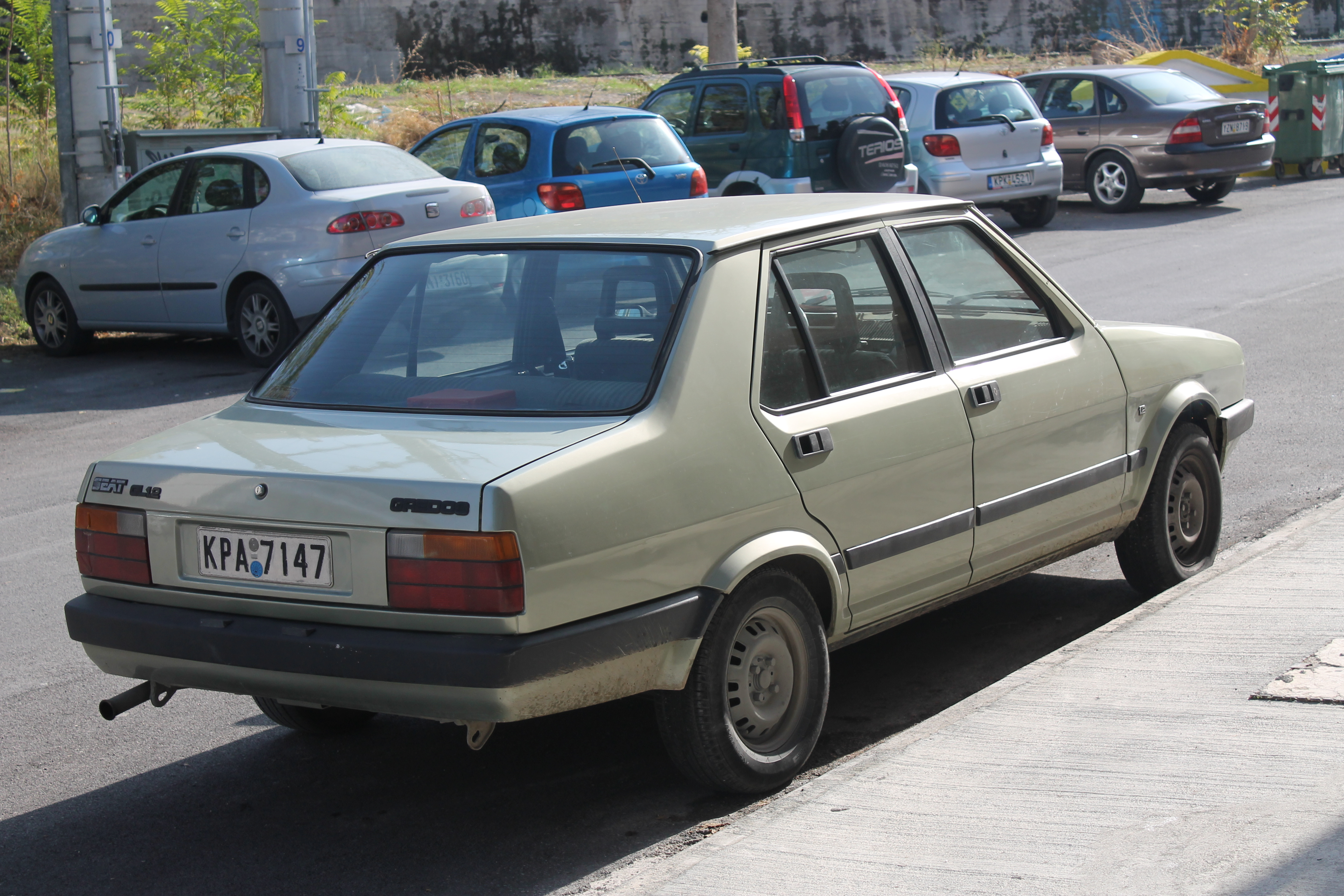
SEAT Gredos GL 1.2 (Greece)

The Málaga sold relatively well in Spain, but was less popular in export markets despite sharing the same System Porsche Powertrain as the SEAT Ibiza. The Málaga was marketed as the SEAT Gredos in Greece after the Spanish mountain range Sierra de Gredos, because the word Málaga was considered too similar to the ubiquitous Greek swear word malakas.

=== United Kingdom ===
The SEAT Málaga was launched in the United Kingdom in September 1985, along with the Ronda and Ibiza. It largely competed with budget offerings such as the Hyundai Pony and those from Lada, Škoda, Yugo and FSO.

== SEAT Málaga Hatchback ==
The SEAT Ronda was also briefly sold in the United Kingdom as the SEAT Málaga hatchback.

== Sales and production figures ==
The total production per year of SEAT Málaga vehicles is shown in the following table:

Model	1986	1987	1988	1989	1990	1991
Total annual production	41,292	37,653	39,269	36,882	33,098	8,735
