= SEAT Ronda =

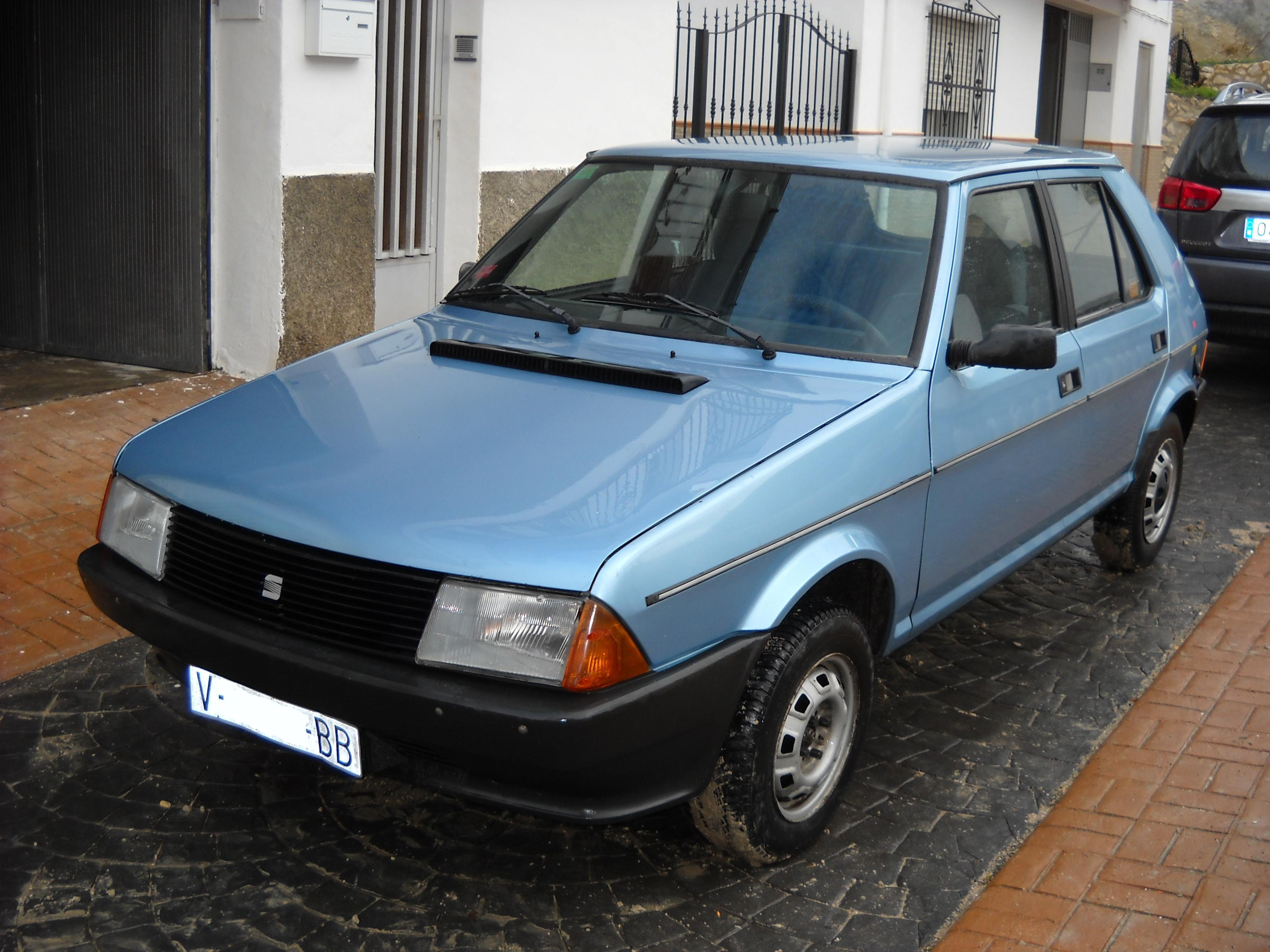
- SEAT Ronda D (pre-facelift)

Overview
- Manufacturer: SEAT
- Model code: 022A
- Also called: SEAT Málaga hatchback (UK)
- Production: 1982–1986; 177,869 produced
- Assembly: Spain: Barcelona (Zona Franca)
- Designer: Tom Tjaarda at Rayton Fissore

Body and chassis
- Class: Compact car (C)
- Body style: 5-door hatchback
- Related: SEAT Ritmo; SEAT Málaga; Fiat Ritmo

Dimensions
- Wheelbase: 2,448 mm (96.4 in)
- Length: 4,011 mm (157.9 in)
- Width: 1,650 mm (65 in)
- Height: 1,400 mm (55 in)

Chronology
- Predecessor: SEAT Ritmo
- Successor: SEAT Leon

The SEAT Ronda (codenamed 022A) is a small family car produced by the Spanish automaker SEAT from 1982 to 1986, and styled by Tom Tjaarda at Rayton Fissore in collaboration with the Technical Centre in Martorell. The Ronda was the first SEAT model named after a Spanish city. 177,869 Rondas were built in total.

== Overview ==
The SEAT Ronda was a restyled SEAT Ritmo which in its turn derived from the Fiat Ritmo. The most visible external design differences between a Ritmo and a Ronda are rectangular headlights on the Ronda in place of the round ones featured on the Ritmo, different tail lights and panels, and changed door handles. Mechanically, there were also some minor differences, mostly due to the use of Spanish-built engines and other parts.

The interior was more commodious than that of the original Ritmo, with a different dashboard with a more complete instrumentation. The seats were deeper and more comfortable, while the door panels were improved and the sound dampening was increased. The Spanish-made transmission was only available in a five-speed manual.

The Ronda featured a boot capacity of 370 litres which could be increased to 1250 litres by folding rear seats. It was introduced with locally built engines from the 124 series or a larger twin cam 1.6, as well as a 1.7-litre diesel unit. Later, a version of Fiat's two-litre engine with a Porsche-developed head (System Porsche) was also installed in the rare Ronda Crono 2000 2.0 model. Only 800 of these were built.

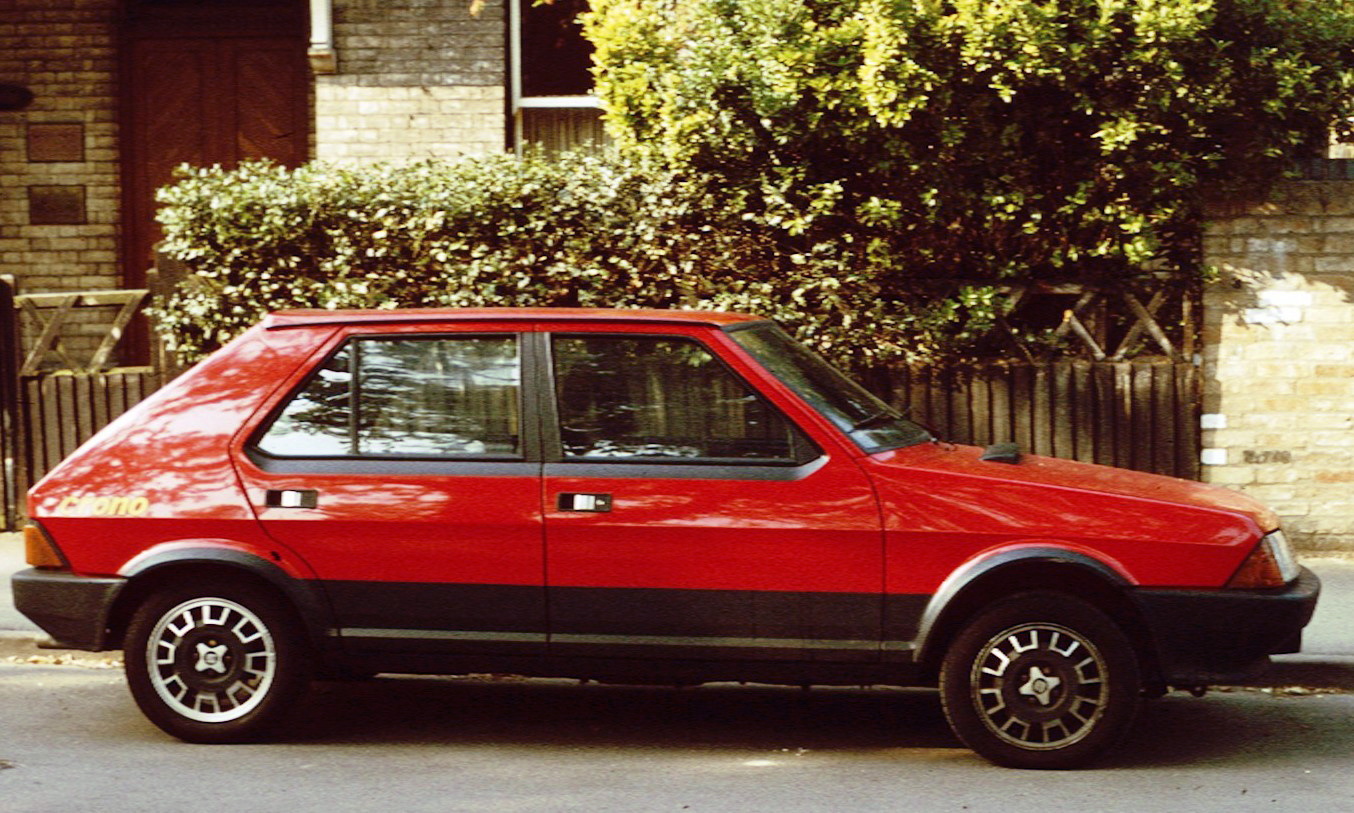
SEAT Ronda P 2000 Crono

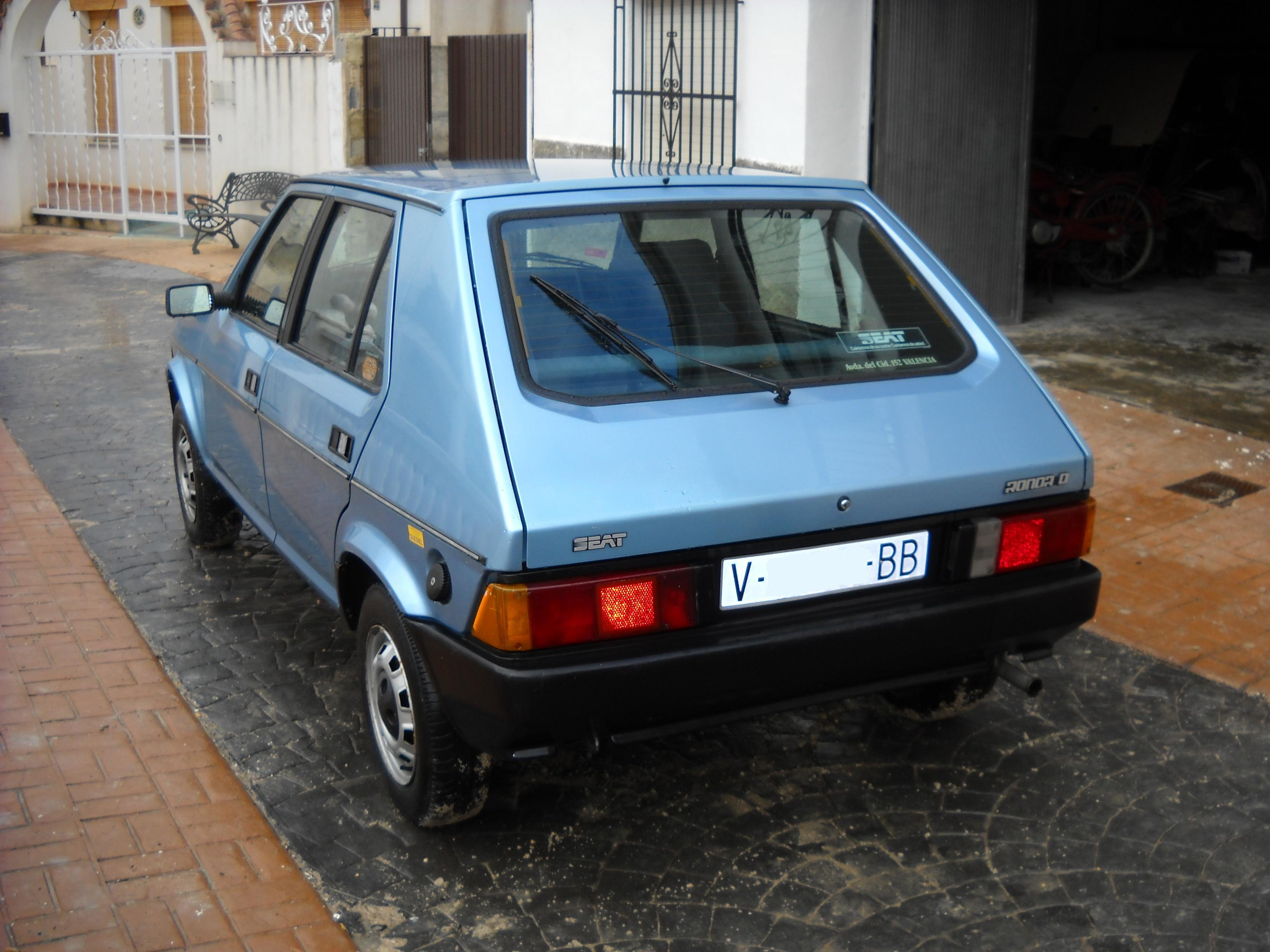
Seat Ronda D (rear view)

After an Autumn-1984 facelift, the Ronda received the "System Porsche" petrol engines which were developed for the Ibiza. The car was now called the Ronda P and carried a stylized "P" on the rear side.

Exports of this, SEAT's first car developed after the split with Fiat, began in April 1983 when the first Rondas were delivered to the Netherlands. In November, sales begun in Italy, the car's second export market. The Ronda was also briefly sold in the United Kingdom as the SEAT Málaga hatchback.

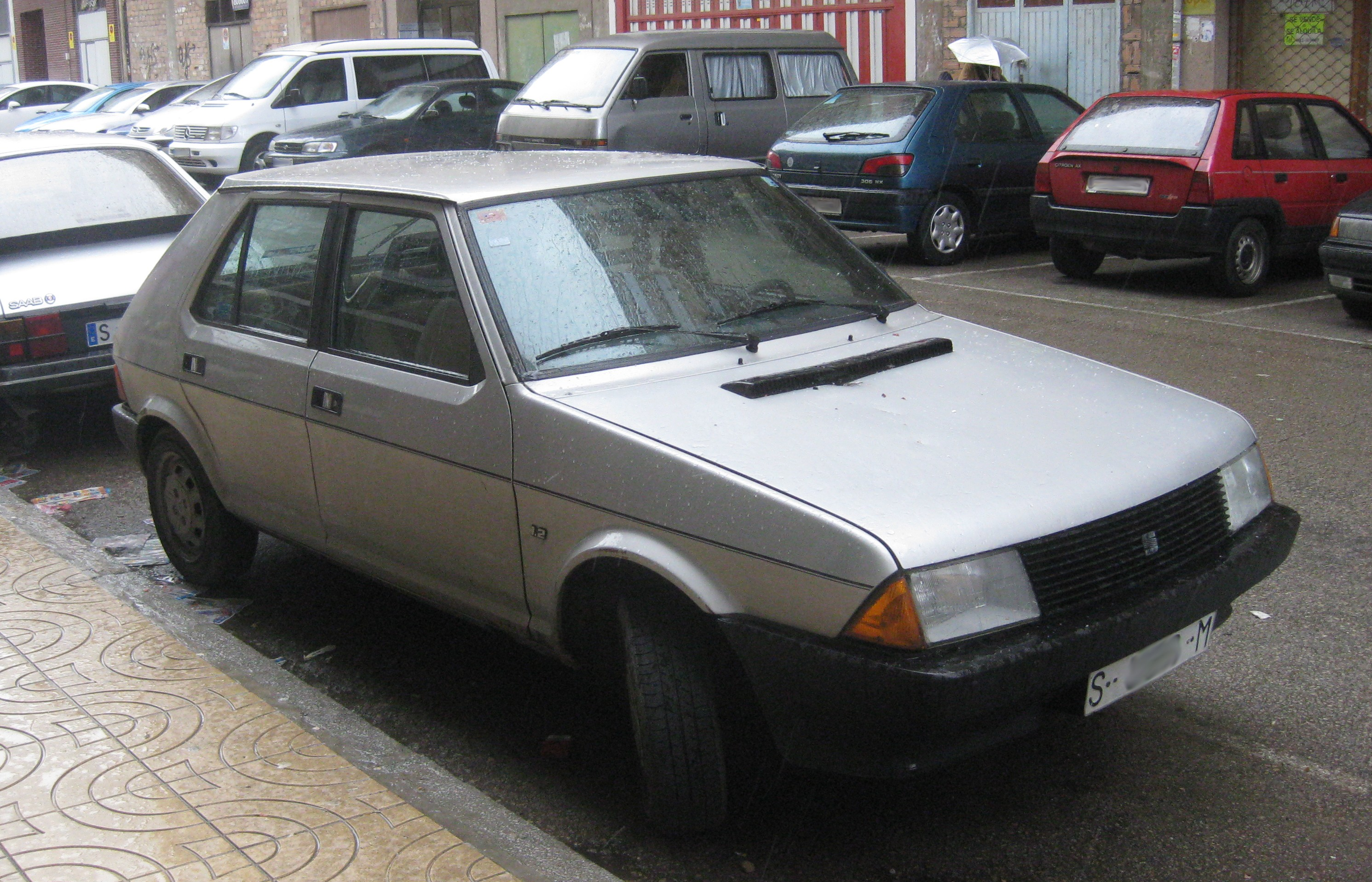
SEAT Ronda GL 1.2 (facelift)

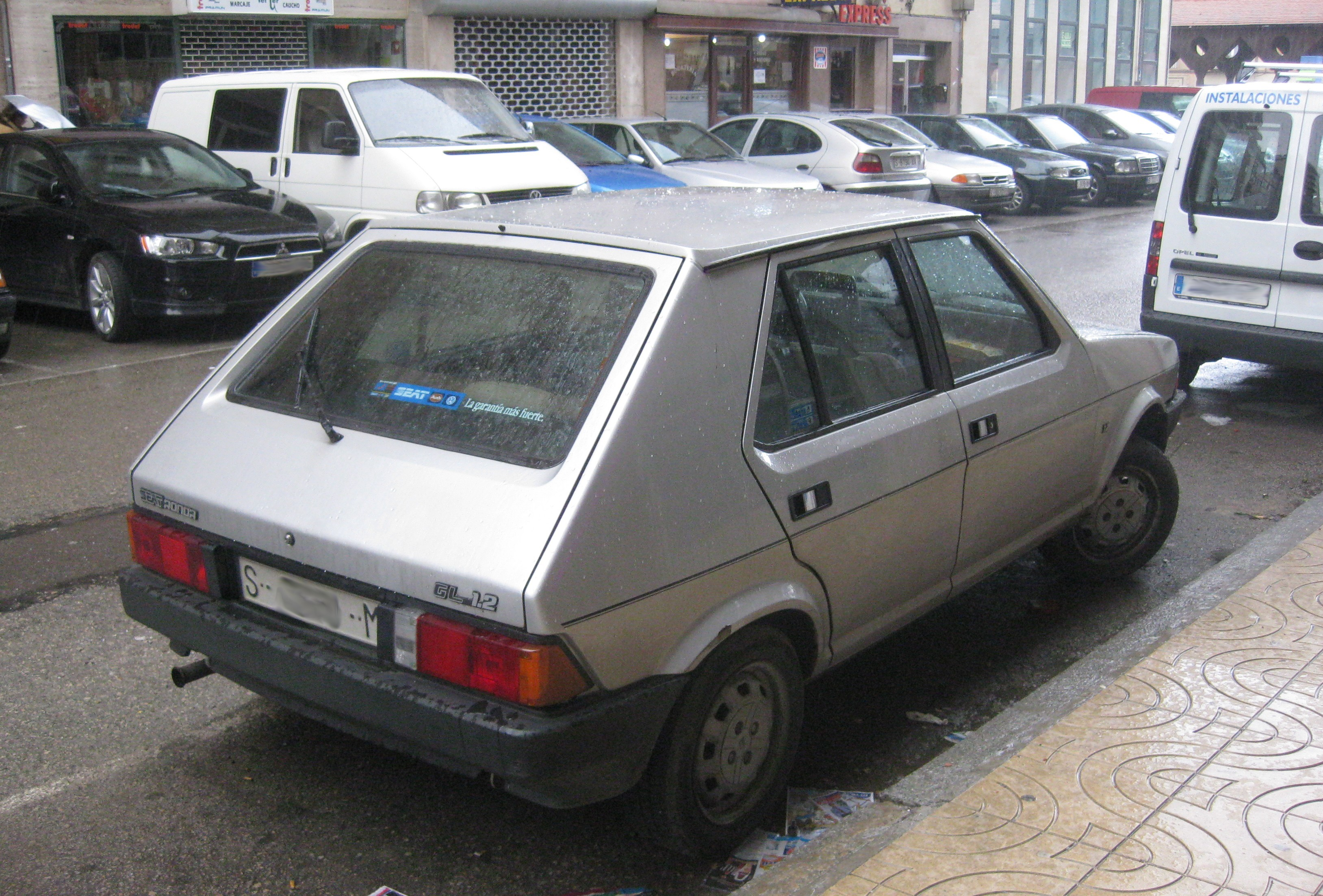
Rear view (facelift)

== Powertrain ==
The engines were:

Ronda (Petrol, 1982-1984)

- 1.2 1197 cc 64 PS (47 kW) 92 N⋅m (68 lb⋅ft)
- 1.4 1438 cc 75 PS (55 kW) 113 N⋅m (83 lb⋅ft)
- 1.6 1592 cc 95 PS (70 kW) 124 N⋅m (91 lb⋅ft)
- 2.0 1995 cc 120 PS (88 kW) 175 N⋅m (129 lb⋅ft)

Ronda P (Petrol, 1984–1986)

- 1.2 1193 cc 63 PS (46 kW) 88 N⋅m (65 lb⋅ft)
- 1.5 1461 cc 86 PS (63 kW) 116 N⋅m (86 lb⋅ft)

Diesel (1982–1986)

- 1.7 D 1714 cc 55 PS (40 kW) 98 N⋅m (72 lb⋅ft)

== Related models ==
=== SEAT Ronda Sport ===
A liftback version of the Ronda was presented in 1982 as the SEAT Ronda Sport. With a styling similar to some of its rivals of the time, such as the Alfa Romeo 33, the Ronda Sport had the trunk separated from the passenger compartment, creating a four-door look with a rear window integrated into the bodywork. This variant was based on the 95 hp 1.6-liter Crono version.

The model also featured a front grille with integrated fog lights, as well as a redesigned front bumper. Furthermore, one of the models had round turn signals on the front fenders and completely new lower door moldings. Two units of the SEAT Ronda Sport were produced.

=== Emelba Ronda ===
The Spanish company Emelba produced several derivative models based on the SEAT Ronda:

- Emelba Ronda Poker: Ronda Panel van version.
- Emelba Ronda Familiar: Ronda Station wagon variant.
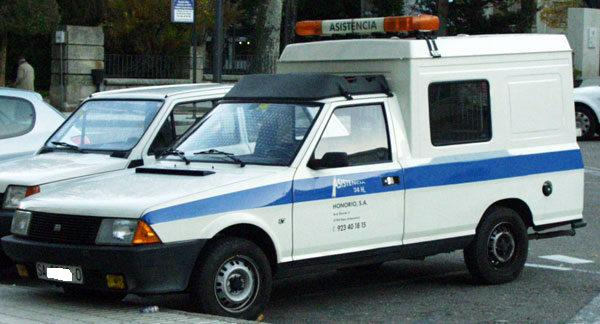
Emelba Ronda Poker

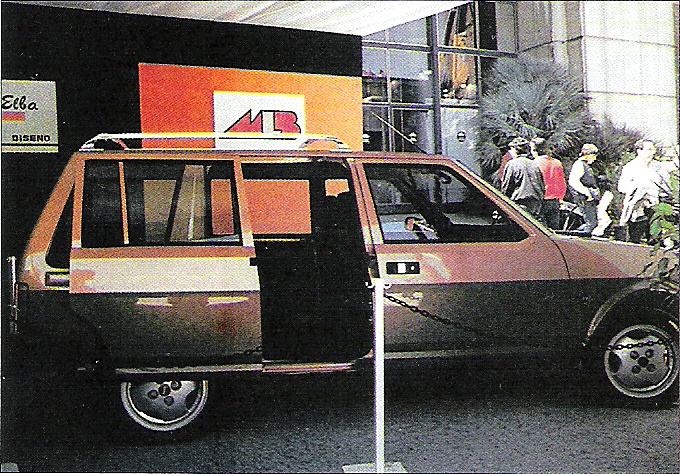
Emelba Ronda Familiar

== The dispute with Fiat ==
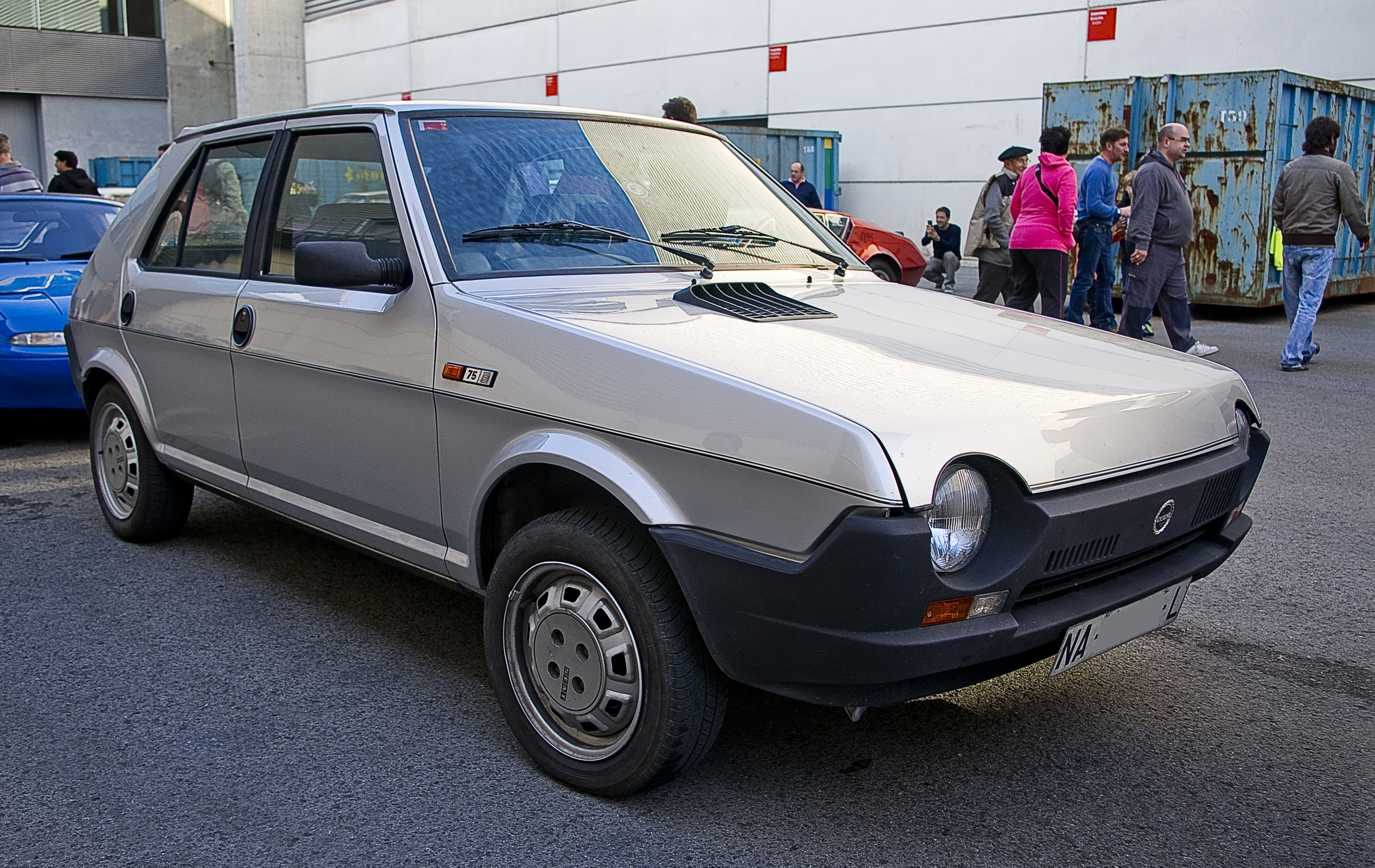
The original Seat Ritmo (1979–1982)

1982 saw the end of almost 30 years of co-operation between SEAT and the automaker Fiat. In order to conform with the end of partnership agreement signed by the two automakers, SEAT had to quickly restyle its entire model range to be able to offer its models on sale, distinguishing its cars from those of the Italian firm. This was marked by a change in SEAT's brand logo and the first car launched without Fiat involvement, the SEAT Ronda, appeared that same year.

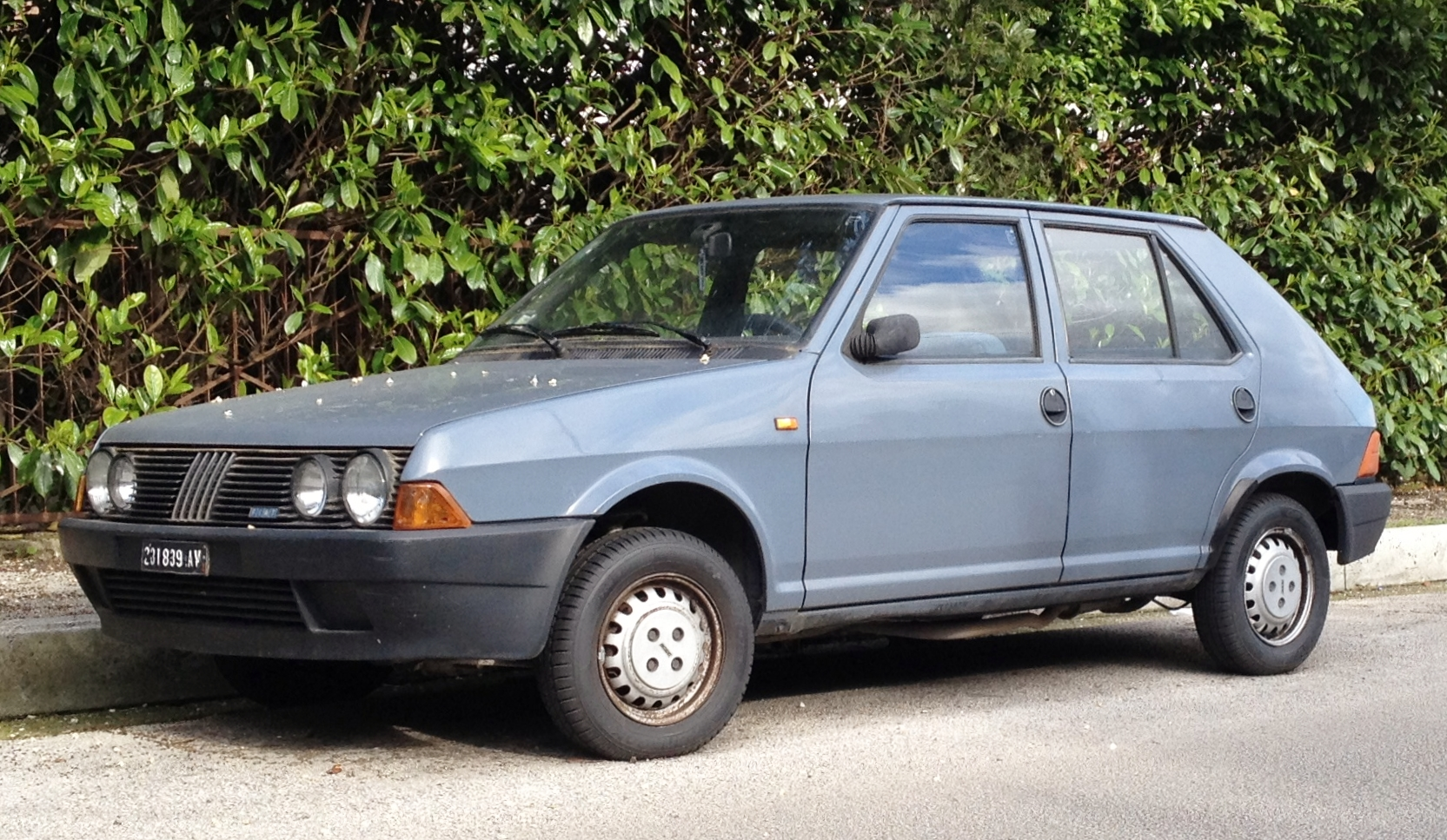
Fiat Nuova Ritmo second series (1982–1984)

The launch of that model though sparked a lawsuit from Fiat against SEAT, as the former claimed the car was still too similar to a car in Fiat's own range, the Fiat Ritmo. In defence of SEAT, the then president of the company, Juan Miguel Antoñanzas, showed a Ronda to the press with all the alterations from the Fiat Ritmo painted bright yellow, to highlight the differences. An El País journalist who covered the trial claimed that the result was spectacular.

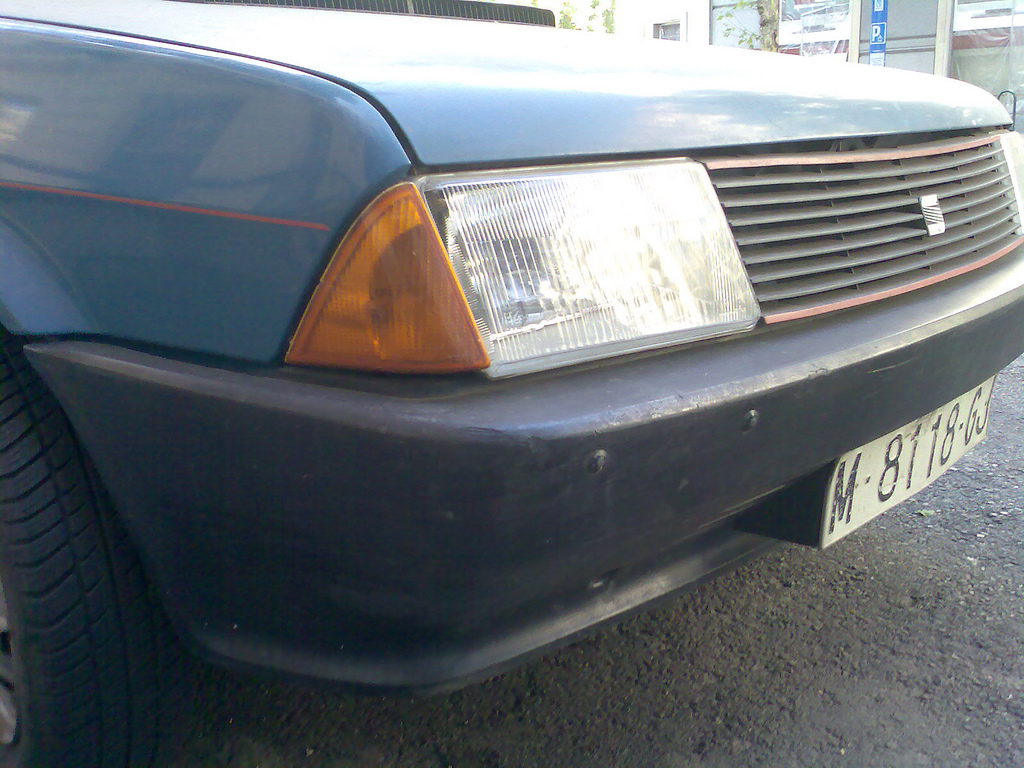
Ronda's front detail

The case was eventually taken to the ICC International Court of Arbitration in Paris which in 1983 declared that differences between the cars were sufficiently substantial for the Ronda not to be judged as a rebadged Ritmo, ending the dispute in favour of SEAT. This also meant that SEAT was free to export the Ronda (and soon afterwards also the Fura), although the car never sold particularly well outside of Spain. Rumour at the time had it that Fiat was angry because the Ronda restyling was in fact too close to their own planned restyling for the Fiat Ritmo, which they had to scrap. Dutch car magazine Autovisie comparison tested the Ronda and the Ritmo in May 1983; the Ritmo was marginally quicker and lighter, and more modern overall, but the Ronda countered with a five to six per cent lower price.

== Production ==
Year	Production
1982	24,609
1983	69,197
1984	55,778
1985	17,571
1986	10,516
1987	67
Total	177,738
