= IL-28 =

IL28 or IL-28 may be:

- Ilyushin Il-28, a Cold War-era Soviet ground attack aircraft
- Interleukin 28, a cytokine for stimulating the growth of T cell lymphocytes
- Illinois Route 28, the former name of U.S. Route 34 in Illinois

== See also ==
- IL (disambiguation)
- 28 (disambiguation)
