= 8/12 =

8/12 may refer to:

- August 12 (month-day date notation)
  - Unite the Right rally, locally referred to as 8/12, a white supremacist rally in Charlottesville, Virginia
- December 8 (day-month date notation)
- 8/12 (film), an upcoming Bengali film

== See also ==
- 12/8 (disambiguation)
