= IL =

IL or Il may refer to:

== Businesses and organizations ==
- Image-Line, a Belgian software company
- International League, Class Triple-A league in North American Minor League Baseball
- Ilyushin, a Russian aircraft manufacturer, whose aircraft are designated with "IL"
- Liberal Initiative, a political party in Portugal
- Infinity Learn, Empowering Education, Illuminating Minds, Inspiring Learning, it is also stand for "IL"
- IL, the IATA airline designator of Trigana Air

== Places ==
- İl, the term for 'province' in Turkey, see Provinces of Turkey
- Il, Iran, a village in Mazandaran Province, Iran
- Israel (ISO 3166-1 alpha-2 country code IL)
- Illinois (US postal abbreviation IL)
- Ilmenau, Thuringia, Germany (former vehicle plate code; newer plates use IK for Ilm-Kreis)

== Science and technology ==
- Interactional linguistics, an interdisciplinary approach to grammar and interaction in the field of linguistics
- Interlingua de Peano, a controlled language of Neo Latin used as an auxiliary language – not to be confused with Interlingua de IALA (IA), a constructed language

=== Biology, chemistry, and medicine ===
- Interleukin, a family of cytokines, in biochemistry
- Introgression line, in plant genetics
- Infralimbic prefrontal cortex nucleus
- Ionic liquid, in chemistry including pharmaceutics, and food science

=== Computing ===
- .il, the Internet Top Level Domain (TLD) code for Israel
- Internet Link protocol, developed originally as part of Plan 9 from Bell Labs
- Insert Line (ANSI), an ANSI X3.64 escape sequence
- Instruction list, an EC 61131-3 programming language
- Intermediate language, in computer science
  - Common Intermediate Language, the compiled form of .NET code
  - Common Language Infrastructure, originally named Microsoft Intermediate Language

== Sports ==
- Injured list, a list of injured baseball players
- Interleague play in Major League Baseball
- Irish League, football league in Northern Ireland

== Other uses ==
- Il, king of Umma, a Sumerian king, circa 2400 BCE
- Il (Korean name), including a list of people with the name
- Il (Shugo Chara!), a character from the manga series Shugo Chara! by Peach-Pit
- International law
- IL (album), a 2016 album of French-Canadian pianist and composer Jean-Michel Blais
- Ugaritic spelling of the deity El
- IL, one way to write the Roman numeral for 49.
- IL, an abbreviation for the Israeli pound, the first currency of Israel
- Irish Language
