= 128 =

128 may refer to

- 128 (number), the natural number following 127 and preceding 129
- AD 128, a year in the 2nd century AD
- 128 BC, a year in the 2nd century BC
- 128 (New Jersey bus)
- 128 Nemesis, a main-belt asteroid
- Fiat 128, also known as the Zastava 128, a small family car
  - SEAT 128, a hatchback based on the Fiat 128

== See also ==
- 128th (disambiguation)
- List of highways numbered 128
- 12/8 (disambiguation)
