= SEAT Ritmo =

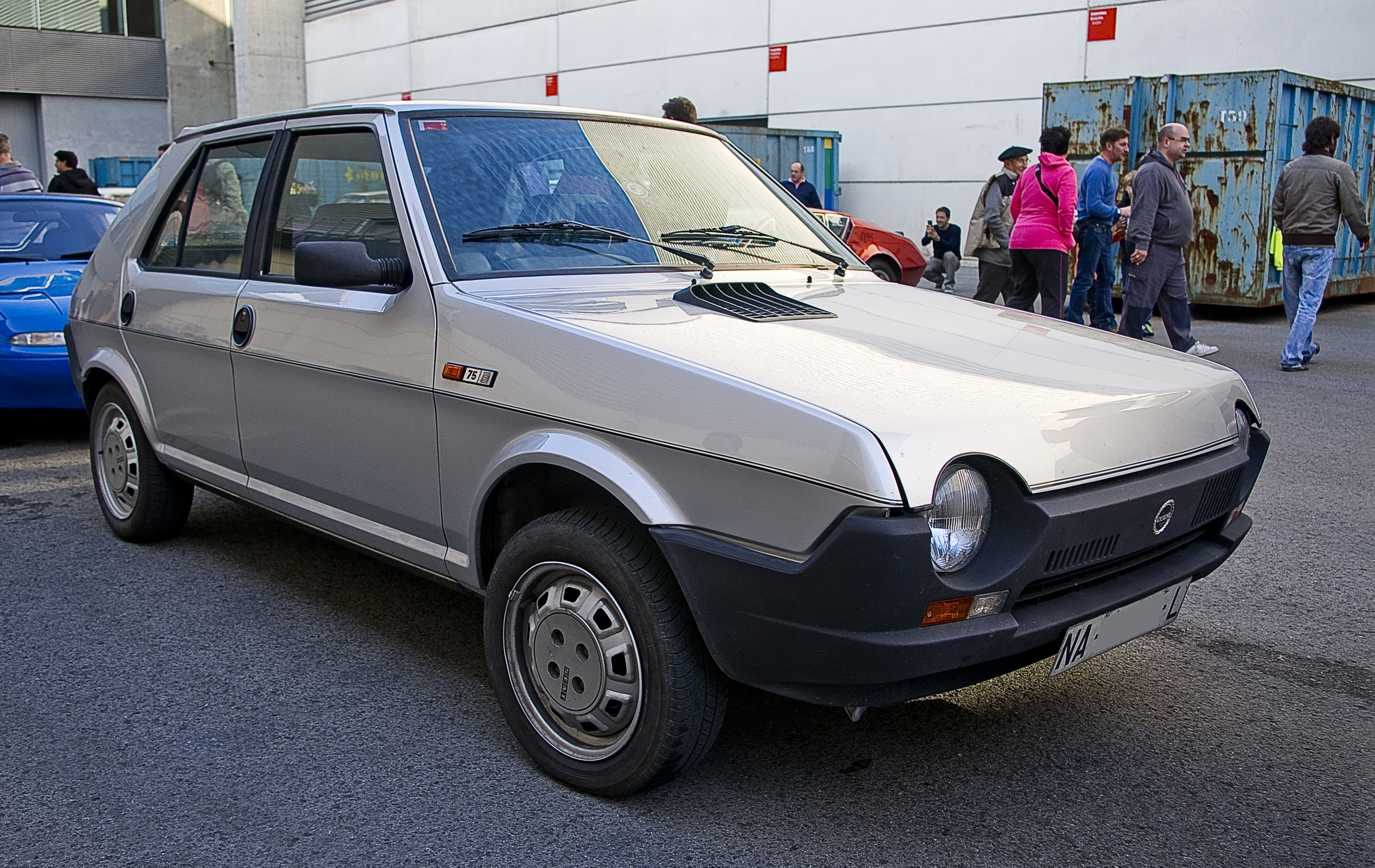
- 1982 Seat Ritmo 75 CLX

Overview
- Manufacturer: SEAT
- Production: 1979–1982; 118,450 produced
- Assembly: Spain: Barcelona (Zona Franca)
- Designer: Pierangelo Andreani (1971) and Sergio Sartorelli at Centro Stile Fiat

Body and chassis
- Class: Compact car (C)
- Body style: 5-door hatchback
- Related: SEAT Ronda; SEAT Ibiza; SEAT Málaga; Fiat Ritmo

Dimensions
- Wheelbase: 2,448 mm (96.4 in)
- Length: 3,937 mm (155.0 in)
- Width: 1,650 mm (65.0 in)
- Height: 1,400 mm (55.1 in)
- Kerb weight: 850–955 kg (1,874–2,105 lb)

Chronology
- Predecessor: SEAT 124; SEAT 128
- Successor: SEAT Ronda

The SEAT Ritmo is a small family car produced by the Spanish automaker SEAT from 1979 to 1982. In 1980, the SEAT Ritmo was named Car of the Year in Spain. The model was also the first to use a non-numerical name, unlike its predecessors.

In 1982, with the end of the partnership between SEAT and Fiat, the Ritmo was heavy restyled into the SEAT Ronda. The Ritmo also provided the underpinnings for both first generation Ibiza and Málaga. 118,450 Ritmos were built in total.

== Overview ==
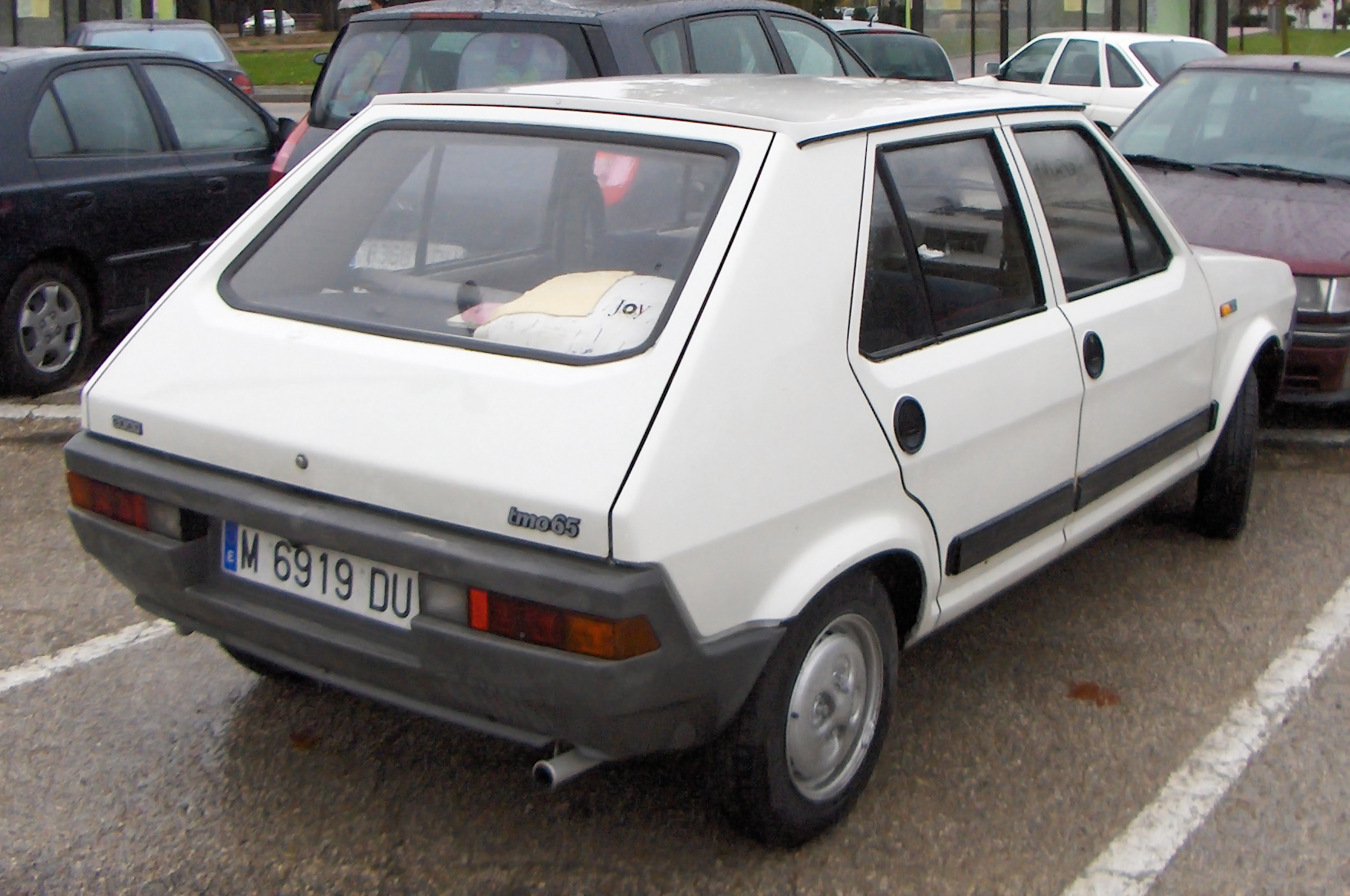
SEAT Ritmo L (rear view)

From 1979 to 1982, a Spanish version of the Fiat Ritmo was produced in Spain near Barcelona; replacing the SEAT 124. The original SEAT Ritmo was equipped with licence-built pushrod engines from the old Fiat 124. Initially, SEAT offered the Ritmo with a four-speed gearbox as the only option, but later the five-speed gearbox was also available as standard in the CLX and Crono versions. The SEAT Ritmo was only offered with a 5-door body style configuration; unlike its italian counterpart, which it was also offered with a three door hatchback and a two door convertible body style.

A special, more sporty variant of the Ritmo was release as the Seat Ritmo 100 TC Crono. This version was launched at the end of its production run, and it was equipped with the 1,592 cc, 95 hp (DIN) Lampredi twin-cam engine; originally from the Fiat 132, which SEAT had also used in the 1430 Special, 124 D Special, and 131. The Ritmo Crono replaced indirectly the SEAT 128 3P.

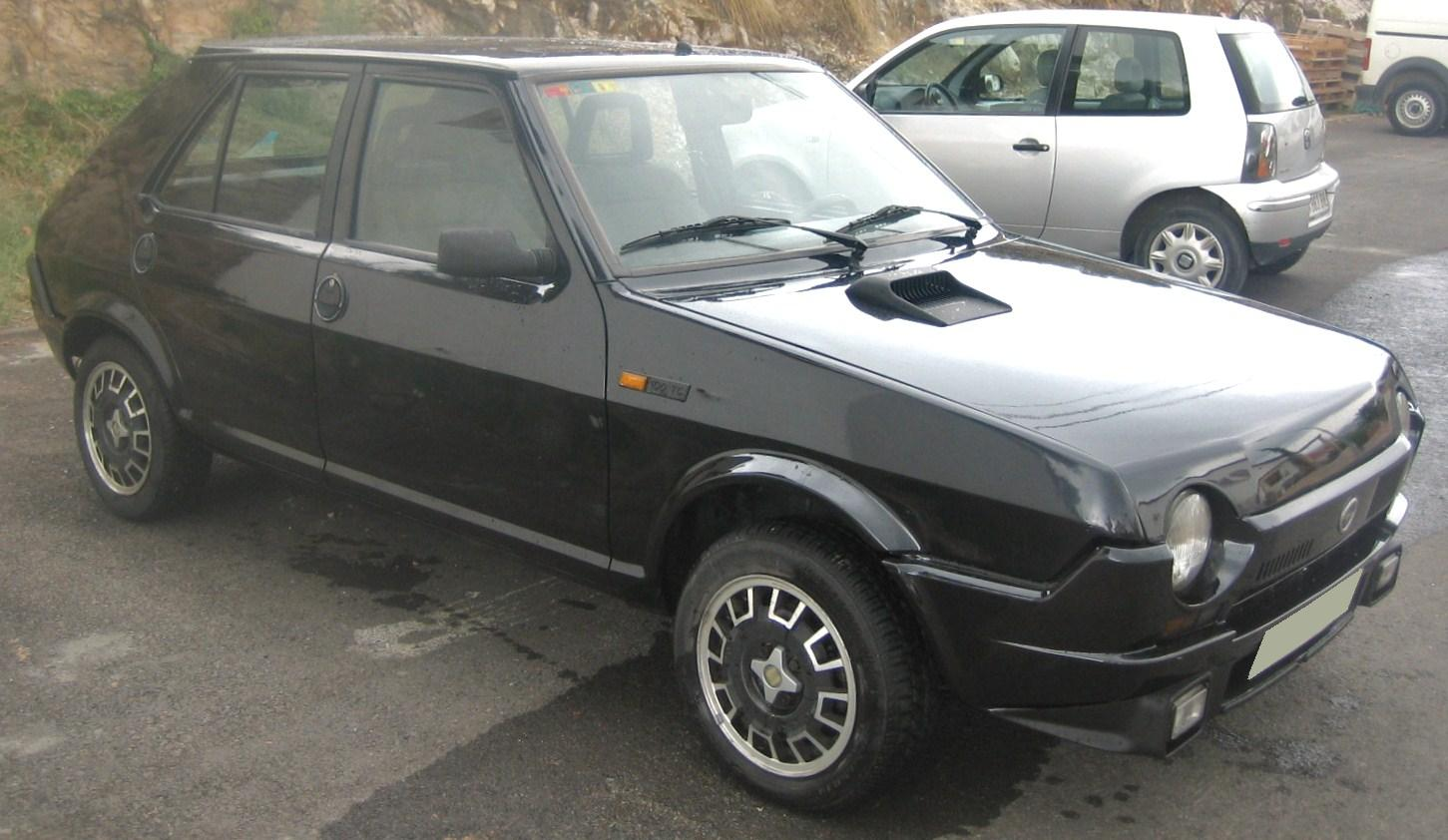
Seat Ritmo 100 TC Crono

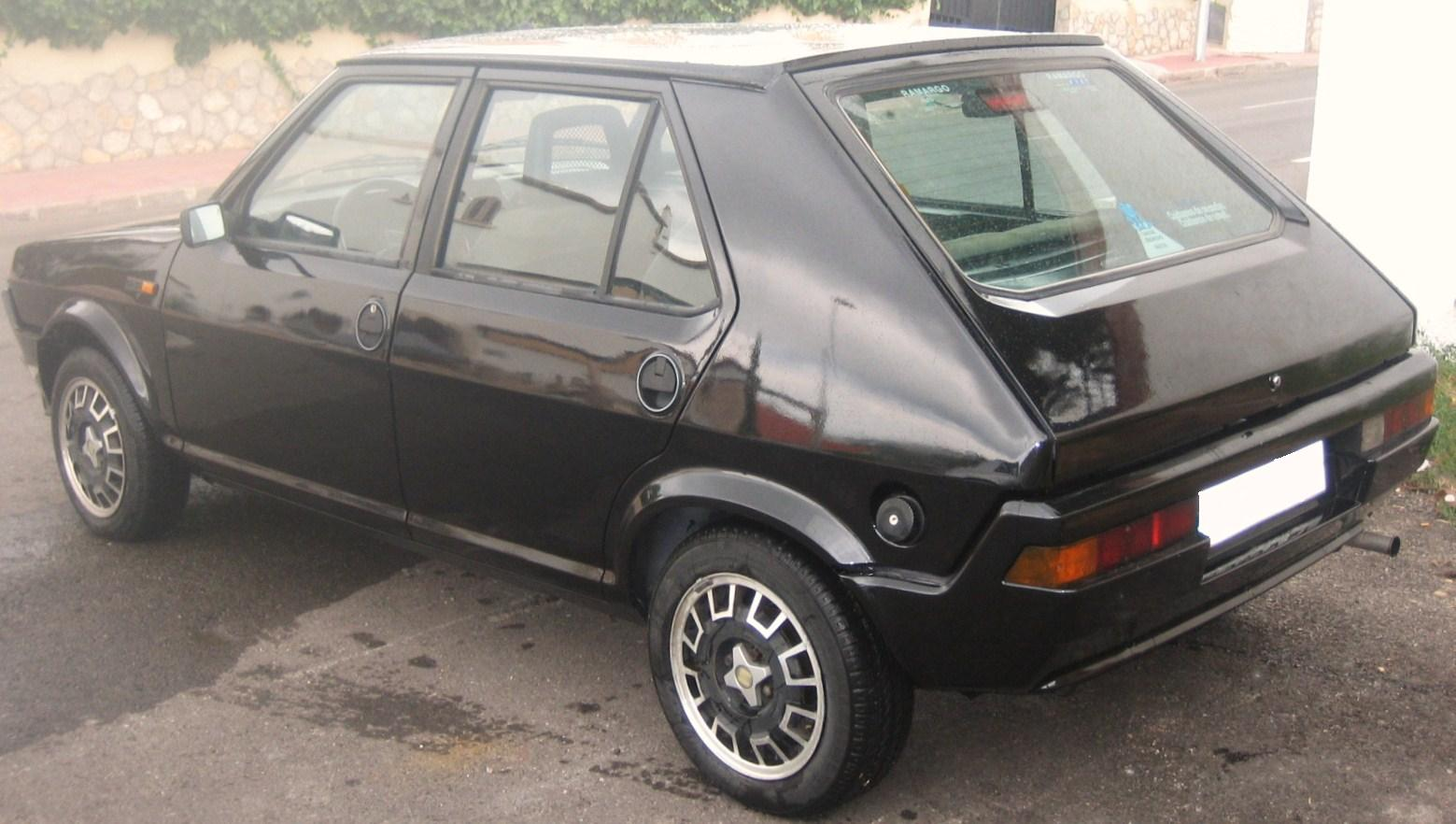
Rear view

The last units of the SEAT Ritmo had their front logo replaced, as the logo was initially round and eventually became rectangular on the front's right side.

== Related models ==
=== SEAT Ronda ===
With the end of the partnership between SEAT and Fiat in 1982, the spanish brand restyled the Ritmo into the Ronda, which remained in production between 1982 and 1986. An intellectual property dispute arose and was ultimately resolved by the Arbitration Chamber of Paris in 1983, which found that the Ronda was sufficiently different from the Ritmo (much to the angst of Fiat due to rumours that its restyle was very close to that of the Ronda). As part of this dispute, SEAT showed a black Ronda with all the in-house developed components painted in bright yellow, in order to highlight key differences between the two products.

In 1982, SEAT entered into a new licensing agreement, this time with Volkswagen. In 1984, SEAT manufactured the new Giugiaro-designed and "System Porsche"-engined Ibiza, which still had Ritmo underpinnings. Moreover, mirroring the Fiat Regata, in 1985 SEAT also developed and launched the four-door Málaga sedan. All ties with Fiat underpinnings were finally severed when Volkswagen took majority ownership of SEAT in 1986 and began producing cars in Spain based on German-developed platforms.

=== Emelba Ritmo Elba ===
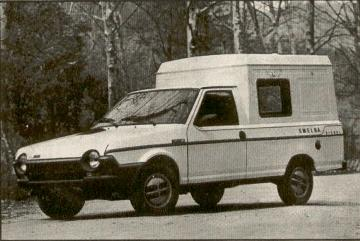
Emelba Ritmo Elba

The Spanish company Emelba produced several derivative models based on the Ritmo, including a panel van version of the Ritmo named Emelba Ritmo Elba.

== The dispute with Fiat ==
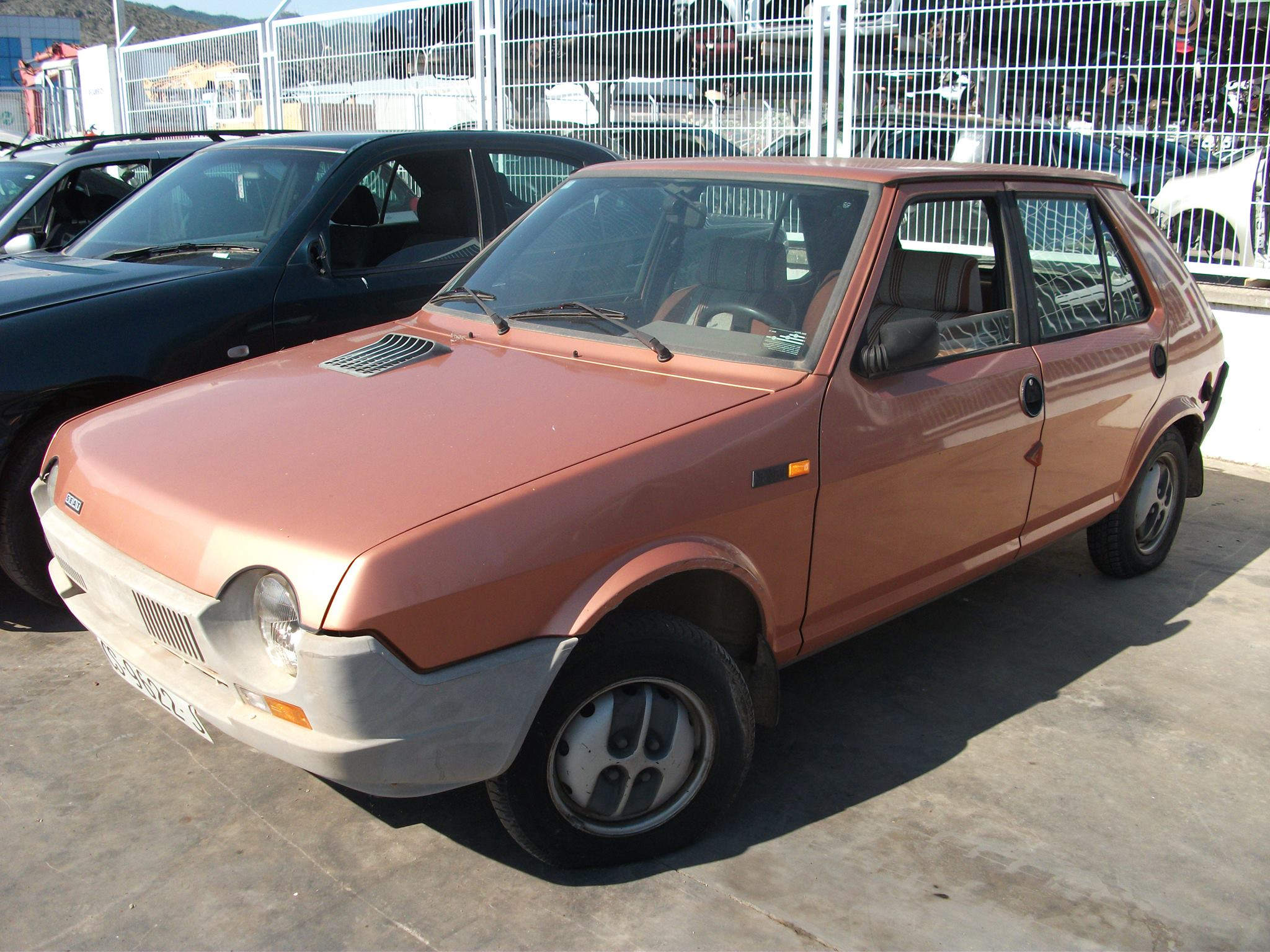
The original Seat Ritmo (1979 - 1982)

1982 saw the end of almost 30 years of co-operation between SEAT and the automaker Fiat. In order to conform with the end of partnership agreement signed by the two automakers, SEAT had to quickly restyle its entire model range to be able to offer its models on sale, distinguishing its cars from those of the Italian firm. This was marked by a change in SEAT's brand logo and the first car launched without Fiat involvement, the SEAT Ronda, appeared that same year.

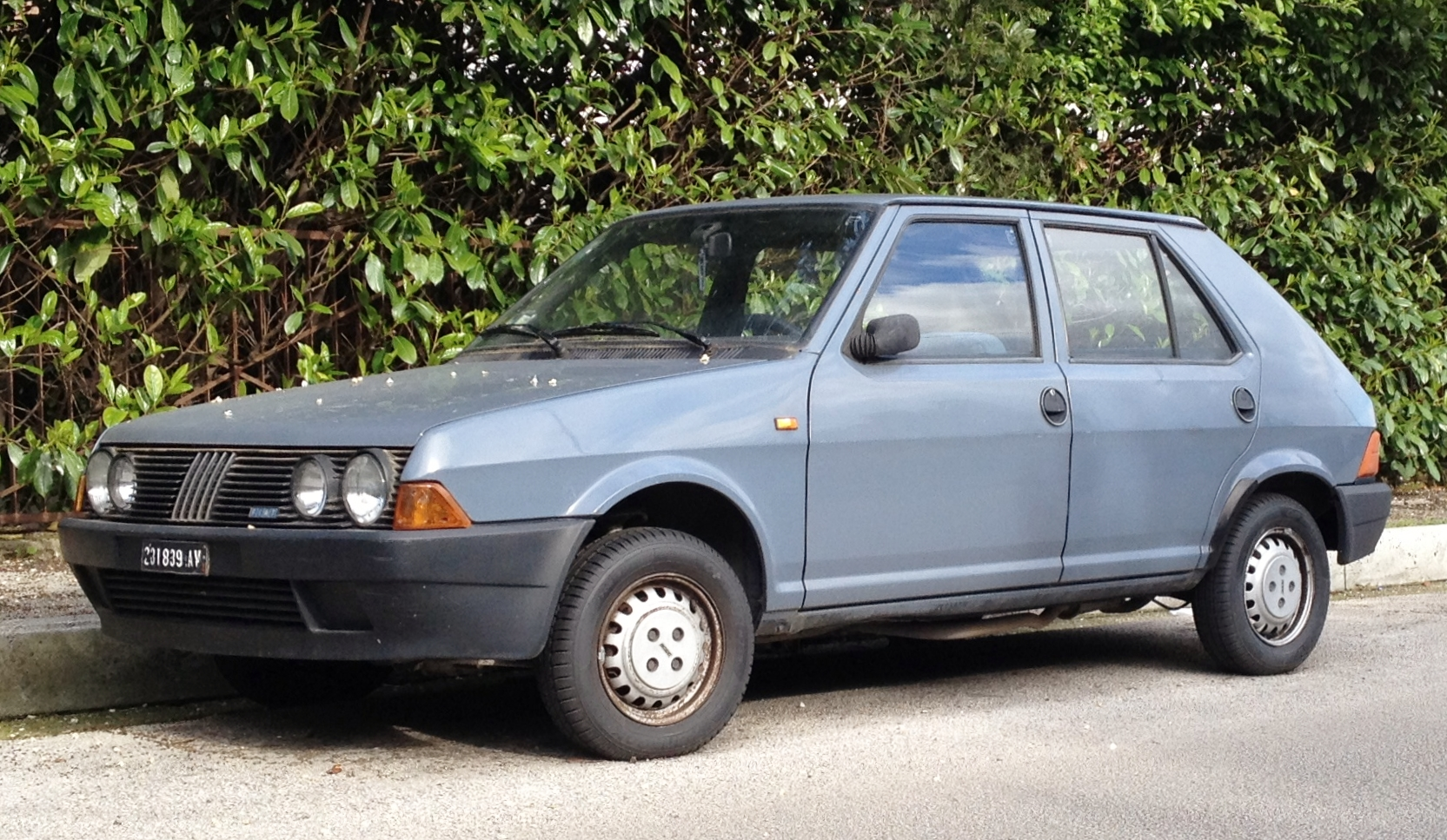
Fiat Nuova Ritmo second series (1982 - 1984)

The launch of that model though sparked a lawsuit from Fiat against SEAT, as the former claimed the car was still too similar to a car in Fiat's own range, the Fiat Ritmo. In defence of SEAT, the then president of the company, Juan Miguel Antoñanzas, showed a Ronda to the press with all the alterations from the Fiat Ritmo painted bright yellow, to highlight the differences. An El País journalist who covered the trial claimed that the result was spectacular.

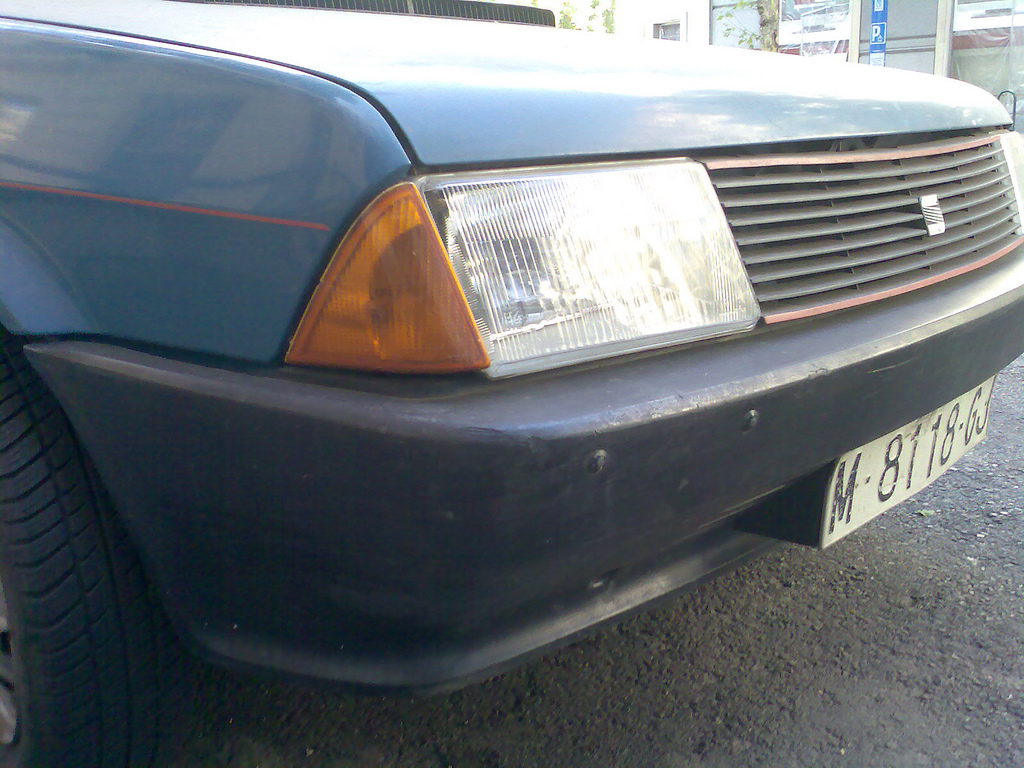
Ronda's front detail

The case was eventually taken to the ICC International Court of Arbitration in Paris which in 1983 declared that differences between the cars were sufficiently substantial for the Ronda not to be judged as a rebadged Ritmo, ending the dispute in favour of SEAT. This also meant that SEAT was free to export the Ronda (and soon afterwards also the Fura), although the car never sold particularly well outside of Spain. Rumour at the time had it that Fiat was angry because the Ronda restyling was in fact too close to their own planned restyling for the Fiat Ritmo, which they had to scrap. Dutch car magazine Autovisie comparison tested the Ronda and the Ritmo in May 1983; the Ritmo was marginally quicker and lighter, and more modern overall, but the Ronda countered with a five to six per cent lower price.
