= 12/8 =

12/8 may refer to:

- December 8 (month-day date notation)
- 12 August (day-month date notation)
- 12/8, in sheet music, a time signature containing twelve quavers per measure
- 12 shillings and 8 pence in UK predecimal currency

== See also ==
- 128 (disambiguation)
- 8/12 (disambiguation)
