= SEAT 128 =

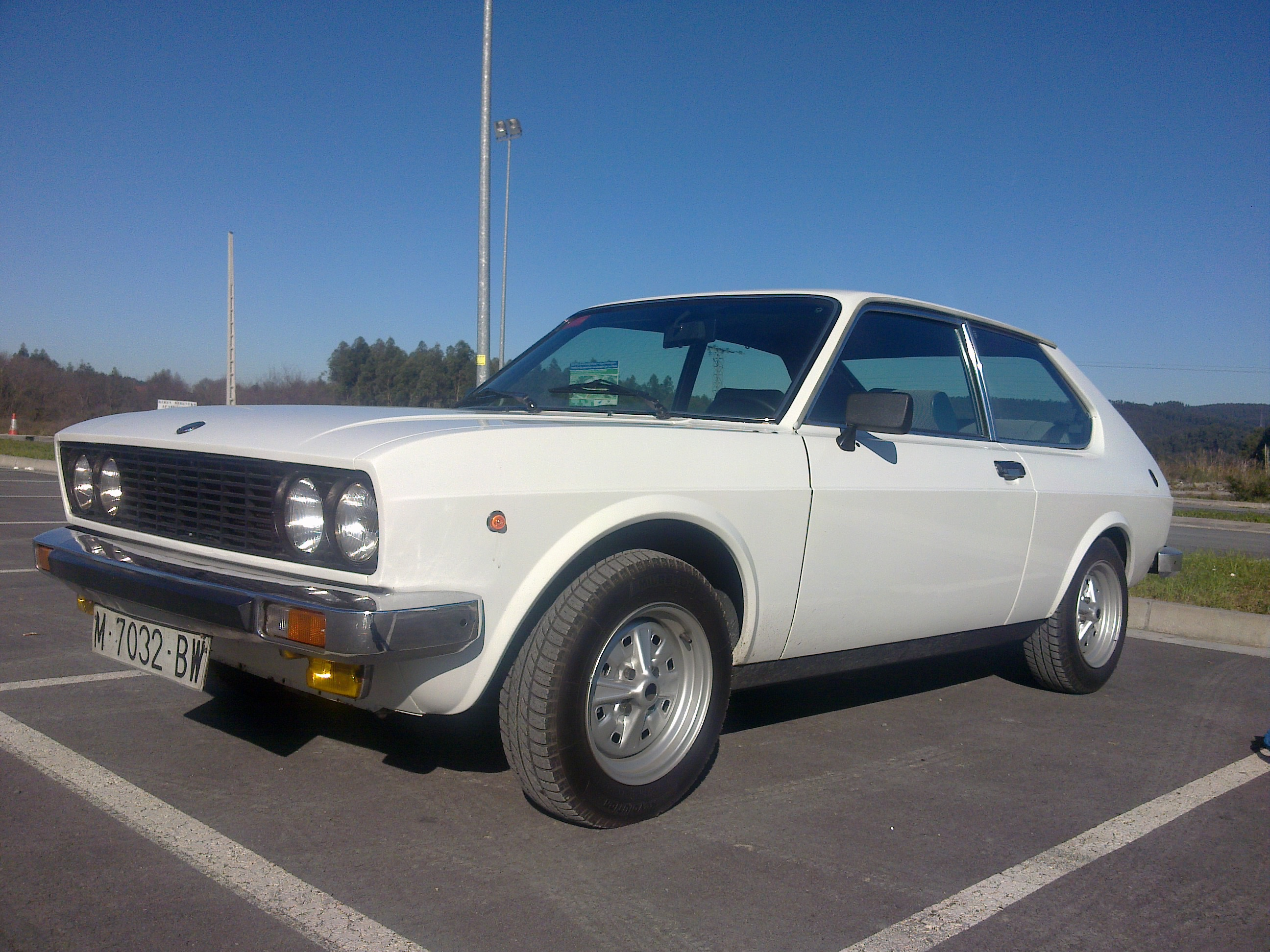

Overview
- Manufacturer: SEAT
- Production: 1976–1980; 31 893 built
- Assembly: Spain: Barcelona (Zona Franca)
- Designer: Paolo Boano at Fiat Centro Stile

Body and chassis
- Body style: 3-door hatchback
- Related: Fiat 128 3P

Powertrain
- Engine: 1,197 cc Lampredi OHV I4; 1,438 cc Lampredi OHV I4

Dimensions
- Wheelbase: 2,220 mm (87 in)
- Length: 3,830 mm (151 in)
- Width: 1,560 mm (61 in)
- Height: 1,260 mm (50 in)
- Curb weight: 850 kg (1,870 lb)

Chronology
- Successor: SEAT Ritmo Crono (indirect)

The SEAT 128 is a 3-door hatchback coupé manufactured by the Spanish automaker SEAT from 1976 to 1980. It is essentially a sporting, three-door hatchback version of the Fiat 128, based on the Fiat 128 3P "Berlinetta".

== Overview ==
Designed at Fiat Centro Stile, the Fiat 128 3P went on sale in Italy a year earlier; the body panels were shipped from Turin to SEAT's Barcelona assembly plant. It was marketed as "Three Times SEAT" in order to underline its triple combination of sportiness, versatility, and looks. The car was aimed at wealthy, young drivers. However, the 128 never enjoyed great commercial success, since in this period of economic recession and transition in Spain most people opted for the smaller, less expensive SEAT 127.

In Spain it was available with two engine options from the Fiat 124 engine family, the 1.2-litre and the more powerful and well-known 1430 engine. A total of 31,893 units were built by SEAT in four years of production.

=== Variants ===
Specials editions of the 128 3P were sold under the SEAT 128 3P Sport name. Only differs on visual cosmetics.

- SEAT 128 3P Sport
- SEAT 128 3P Sport 1.100
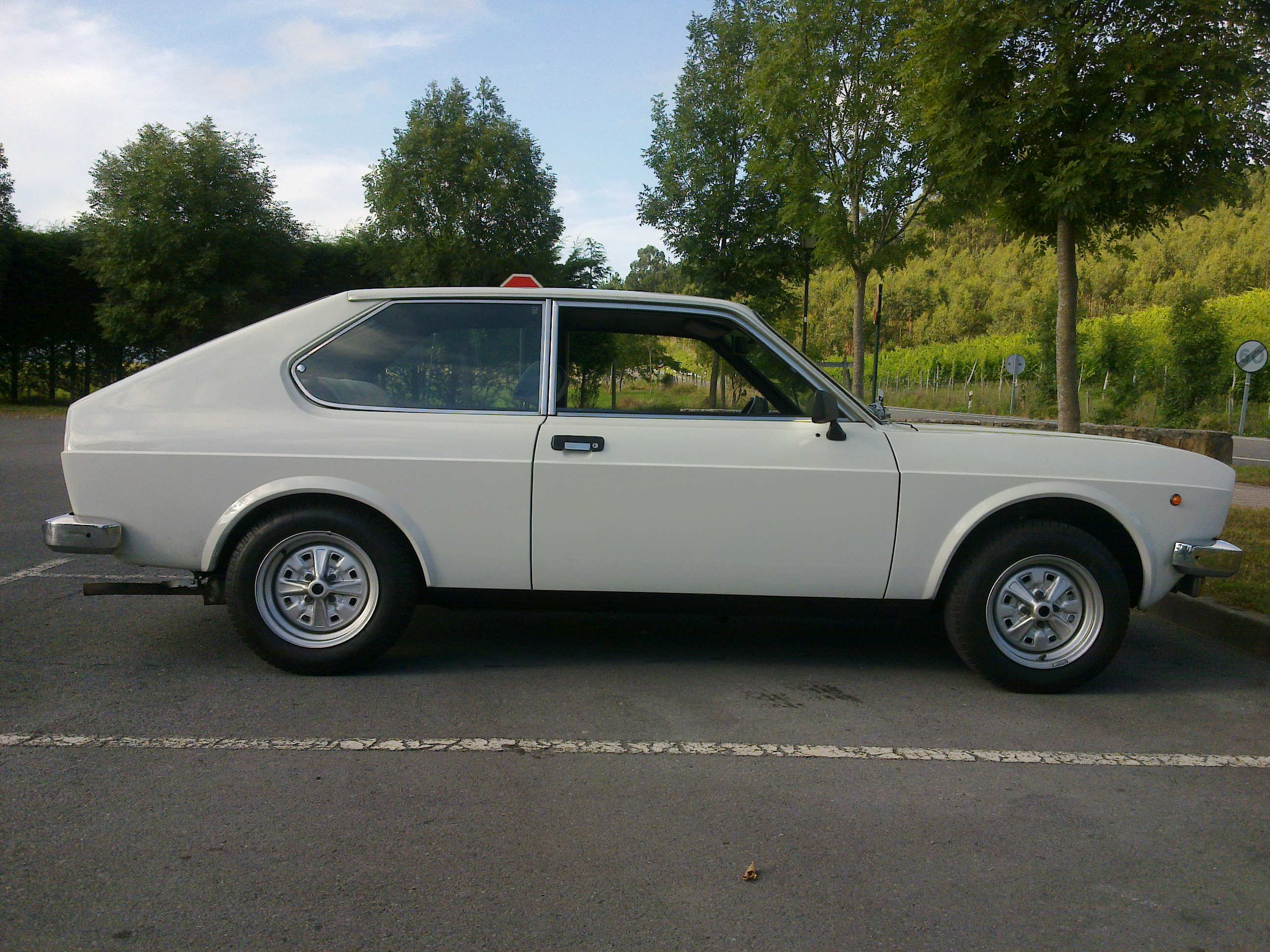
Side view

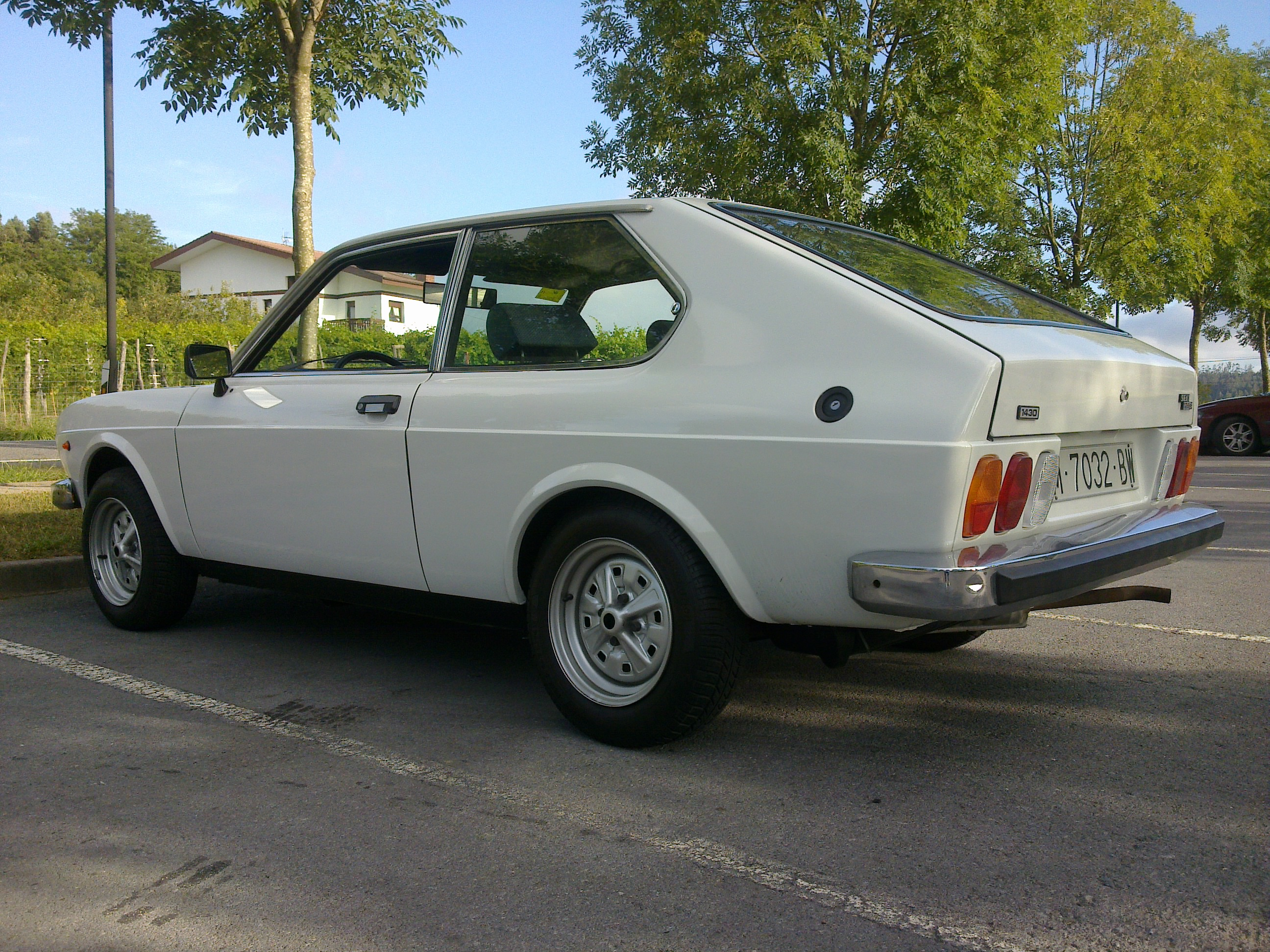
Rear view

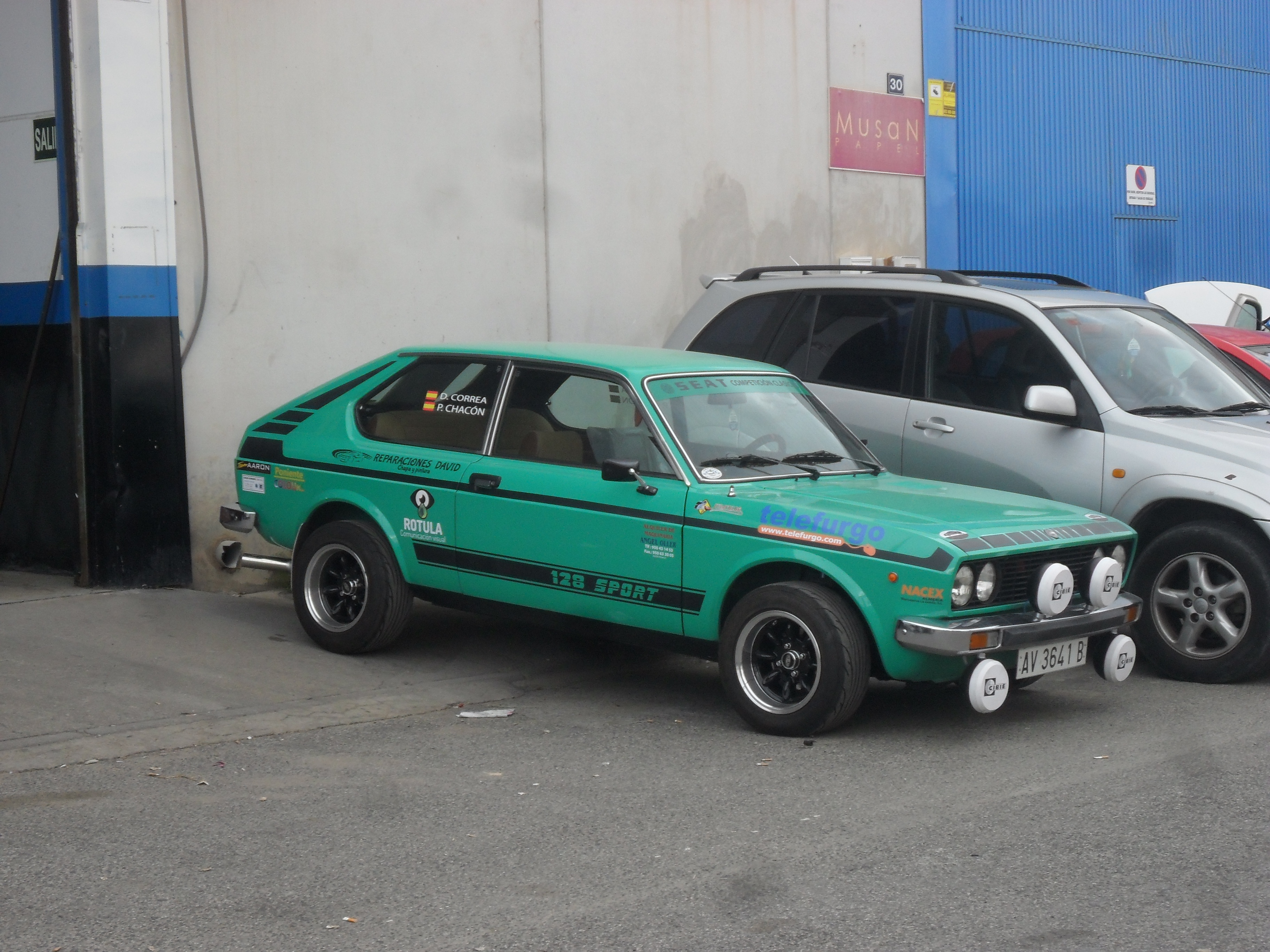
SEAT 128 3P Sport

== Technical data ==
SEAT 128 (1977)

SEAT	1200 Engine	1430 Engine
Engine:	4-cylinder-inline engine (four-stroke), front-mounted	
Displacement:	1,197 cc	1,438 cc
Bore x Stroke:	73 mm × 71.5 mm (2.9 in × 2.8 in)	80 mm × 71.5 mm (3.1 in × 2.8 in)
Max. Power @ rpm:	67 PS (49 kW; 66 hp) / 5,600	77 PS (57 kW; 76 hp) / 5,400
Max. Torque @ rpm:	90 N⋅m (66 lb⋅ft) / 3,700	111 N⋅m (82 lb⋅ft) / 3,400
Compression Ratio:	8.8:1	9.0:1
Fuel system:	1 downdraft carb. (2bbl)	
Valvetrain:	OHV, camshaft in block, tooth belt	
Cooling:	Water	
Gearbox:	4-speed-manual, front wheel drive	
Front suspension:	MacPherson struts, coil springs, hydraulic telescopic shock absorbers	
Rear suspension:	Double wishbones, struts, transverse leaf spring	
Brakes:	Front disc brakes (Ø 227 mm), rear drum brakes	
Steering:	Rack-and-pinion steering	
Body:	Steel, unibody construction	
Track front/rear:	1,320 / 1,330 mm (52.0 / 52.4 in)	
Wheelbase:	2,220 mm (87.4 in)	
Length x Width x Height:	3,830 mm × 1,560 mm × 1,260 mm (150.8 in × 61.4 in × 49.6 in)	
Weight:	850 kg (1,874 lb)	850 kg (1,874 lb)
Top speed:	151.3 km/h (94 mph)	158.4 km/h (98 mph)
0–100 km/h (0-62 mph):	n.a.	n.a.
Fuel consumption (DIN):	n.a.	n.a.
