= Il (Korean name) =

- Hangul: 일
- RR: Il
- MR: Il

Il is a Korean given name. Notable people with the name include:

- Yi Il (1538–1601), Joseon Dynasty general
- Kim Il (politician) (1910–1984), Premier of North Korea from 1972 to 1976
- Nam Il (1915–1976), North Korean general
- Kim Il (1929–2006), Japanese name Kintarō Ōki, South Korean professional wrestler
- Bak Il (born 1949), South Korean voice actor
- Il Lee (born 1952), South Korean-born American visual artist
- Kim Il (pentathlete) (born 1962), South Korean pentathlete
- Won Il (born 1967), South Korean musician
- Kim Il (wrestler) (born 1971), North Korean wrestler
- Yoo Il (born Park Sang-il, 1990), South Korean actor

== See also ==
- List of Korean given names
