= LLL =

LLL may refer to:

== Arts and entertainment ==
- Leisure Suit Larry in the Land of the Lounge Lizards, the first of a series of video games
- Love's Labour's Lost, a comedy by William Shakespeare
- Landau, Luckman, and Lake, a fictional holding company in Marvel Comics
- "L. L. L.", a 2015 song by Myth & Roid
- The Sea Devils, a 1972 Doctor Who serial (production code LLL)

== Businesses and organisations ==
- L3 Technologies, an American defense contractor formerly with the NYSE stock symbol LLL
- La Leche League, an organization that promotes breastfeeding
- Lambda Lambda Lambda, a co-ed fraternity
- Loyal Lusitanian Legion, a foreign volunteer corps of the British Army, that fought in the Peninsular War
- Lutheran Laymen's League, also known as Lutheran Hour Ministries, a Christian outreach ministry

== Science and technology ==
- Low-level programming language, such as machine code or assembly
- Lenstra–Lenstra–Lovász lattice basis reduction algorithm, a polynomial time lattice reduction algorithm
- Lowest Landau level, wave functions in quantum mechanics
- Lovász local lemma, a lemma in probability theory
- Lawrence Livermore Laboratory, now known as Lawrence Livermore National Laboratory, a scientific research laboratory in the US
- One of the programming languages used in Ethereum

== Other uses ==
- LL.L (Legum Licentiatus), a degree in civil law at various Canadian universities (especially in Québec)
- Lifelong learning
- "Lunatic, Liar, or Lord", a common summary of Lewis's trilemma, a theological argument from C. S. Lewis

== See also ==
- L3 (disambiguation)
- 3L (disambiguation)
- LL (disambiguation)
- LLLL (pronounced "four-el"), stage name of Kazuto Okawa, a Japanese musician
- III (disambiguation)
- Ill (disambiguation)
