= L3 =

L3, L03, L.3 or L-3 may refer to:

== In arts and media ==
- Live, Loud & Local, a show launched by band The Matches in the Oakland, California region
- Leprechaun 3, a film
- L3-37, a droid in Solo: A Star Wars Story
- Lower third, in television and film a graphic overlay placed in the title-safe lower area of the screen.

== Businesses ==
- L3 Technologies, an American electronics and defence company
- L3Harris Technologies, the successor to L3 Technologies following the merger with Harris Corporation in 2019
- DHL De Guatemala (IATA code L3), a cargo airline based in Guatemala
- LTU Austria (IATA code L3), an airline based in Austria

== In science and technology ==
=== Biology and medicine ===
- L3, the third lumbar vertebra, in human anatomy
- the third larval stage in the Caenorhabditis elegans worm development
- ATC code L03 Immunostimulants, a subgroup of the Anatomical Therapeutic Chemical Classification System
- Haplogroup L3 (mtDNA), a human mitochondrial DNA (mtDNA) haplogroup generally found in East Africa

=== Computing and telecommunications ===
- L-3, an L-carrier cable system developed by AT&T
- L3 microkernel, a microkernel operating system by German computer scientist Jochen Liedtke
- The Level-3 CPU cache in a computer
- ISO/IEC 8859-3 (Latin-3), an 8-bit character encoding
- L3 technical support, the highest level dealing with the most difficult or advanced problems.

=== Transportation ===
==== Air- and spacecraft ====
- Aeronca L-3 Grasshopper, a light airplane used by the USAAF during World War II
- Avia L.3, an Italian plane used for training by the Regia Aeronautica
- Macchi L.3, a 1916 Italian biplane flying boats
- Soyuz 7K-L3, a crewed lunar lander design type in Russia's Soyuz space program
  - N1/L3, the Soviet crewed lunar landing program

==== Other modes of transportation ====
- L3/33 and L3/35, Italian tankettes used in World War II
- L03, a Chevrolet Small-Block engine model
- Soviet submarine L-3, a 1931 Leninets class minelayer submarine
- SP&S Class L-3, an 1883 steam locomotives class
- L3 (New York City bus), a temporary bus route in New York City
- LNER Class L3, a class of British steam locomotives
- The Kingsford branch of the CBD and South East Light Rail in Sydney, Australia, is numbered L3
- L3, an S-Bahn line of the Léman Express in Switzerland and France

=== Other uses in science and technology ===
- L3, a form of low-alloy special purpose steel
- L3 (CERN), one of the four detectors of the Large Electron-Positron Collider
- L^{3} (length^3), volume
- The third Lagrange Point in a gravitational system
- Latitude/Longitude Locator, an STS-32 Space Shuttle mission experiment

== See also ==
- 3L (disambiguation)
- LLL (disambiguation)
- Level 3 (disambiguation)
- L band, radio frequencies in the electromagnetic spectrum
