= Blow Your Mind =

Blow Your Mind or Blow Ya Mind may refer to:

== Music ==
=== Songs ===
- "Blow Your Mind" (Redman song), 1992
- "Blow Your Mind" (Jamiroquai song), 1993
- "Blow Your Mind" (J. Williams song), 2008
- "Blow Your Mind", a 2006 song by Jesse McCartney from the album Right Where You Want Me
- "Blow Your Mind", a 2007 song by Monster Magnet from the album 4-Way Diablo
- "Blow Your Mind", a 2015 instrumental by Tiësto and MOTi
- "Blow Your Mind (Mwah)", a 2016 song by Dua Lipa from the self-titled album
- "Blow Ya Mind", a 2007 song by Styles P from the album Super Gangster (Extraordinary Gentleman)
- "Blow Ya Mind", a 1999 song by Lock 'n' Load
- "Blow Ya Mind", a song by Nicki Minaj from the album Pink Friday
- "Blow Ya Mind", a 2005 song by T-Pain from the album Rappa Ternt Sanga

=== Albums ===
- Blow Your Mind, a 2018 album by Wilko Johnson

== Other ==
- Blow Your Mind, a 2014 animal show from list of BBC children's television programmes

== See also ==
- Blow My Mind (disambiguation)
- "Let Me Blow Ya Mind", a song by Eve and Gwen Stefani
