= LNL =

LNL or LnL may refer to:

- Late Night Live, Australian radio program
- Liberty National Life Insurance Company, US
- Longnan Chengzhou Airport, IATA code
- Laboratori Nazionali di Legnaro, Italian physics institute
- Luke and Laura, fictional characters from the soap opera General Hospital
- Lunar Lake, the codename for the Series 2 Core Ultra processors designed by Intel

== See also ==
- L&L (disambiguation)
- Lock N' Load (disambiguation)
