= Lock and Load =

Lock and Load or Lock 'N Load may refer to:

== Games ==
- Lock 'n Load (tabletop game)
- Lock & Load: Character Primer for Iron Kingdoms
- Lock 'n Load Publishing, of board and computer games

== Music ==
- Lock 'n Load (album), a comedy album by Denis Leary
- Lock 'n' Load (duo), a Dutch music duo who had a number one UK Independent Single in 2000
- T·O·S (Terminate on Sight) or Lock and Load, an album by G-Unit
- Lock & Load, an album by Leslie Fish
- "Lock and Load", a song by Bob Seger from It's a Mystery
- "Lock and Load", a song by Lil Wayne from Tha Carter II
- "Lock and Load", a song by The Mess Hall from Feeling Sideways
- "Lock and Load", a song by Snapper from A.D.M.
- "Lock & Load", a song by Bone Crusher from AttenCHUN!
- "Lock-n-Load", a song by Layzie Bone from Thug by Nature
- "Lock and Load" a song on the Devil May Cry Original Soundtrack
- "Lock 'n' Load", a song by Matisse & Sadko

== Television ==
- Lock 'N Load (TV series), about gun enthusiasts
- Lock N' Load with R. Lee Ermey, about weapon history
- "Lock & Load", a 2006 episode of The Colbert Report
- "Lock and Load, Babe", an episode of Vanishing Son
