= Ill =

ILL, or Ill, or ill may refer to:

== Places ==
- Ill (France), a river in Alsace, France, tributary of the Rhine
- Ill (Vorarlberg), a river in Vorarlberg, Austria, tributary of the Rhine
- Ill (Saarland), a river of Saarland, Germany, tributary of the Theel
- Illinois (traditionally abbreviated: Ill.), a state in the midwestern region of the United States
- Illorsuit Heliport (location identifier: ILL), a heliport in Illorsuit, Greenland
- Institut Laue–Langevin, a research centre in Grenoble, France
- Willmar Municipal Airport (IATA code: ILL), a city-owned public use airport

== Other uses ==
- Ill (video game), an upcoming survival horror video game
- Illness, a generally-used synonym for disease
- Koji Nakamura (recording under the name iLL), a Japanese musician
- Tommy Ill, Wellington in New Zealand based rapper
- I Love Lucy, a landmark American television sitcom
- Interlibrary loan
- Template:Interlanguage link, a template in multiple Wikipedias

== See also ==
- III (disambiguation)
- I'll (disambiguation)
