= LL =

LL may refer to:

== Language ==
- Ll or ll, a digraph that occurs in several natural languages
- 'll, meaning will or shall in contractions

== Arts and entertainment ==
=== Gaming ===
- LearnedLeague, an online trivia website and competition
- Labyrinth Lord, a fantasy role-playing game
- Nintendo DSi LL, the Japanese name for the Nintendo DSi XL
- Nintendo 3DS LL, the Japanese name for the Nintendo 3DS XL
- New Nintendo 3DS LL, the Japanese name for the New Nintendo 3DS XL
- New Nintendo 2DS LL, the Japanese name for the New Nintendo 2DS XL

=== Other uses in arts and entertainment ===
- The Evil of the Daleks, a 1967 Doctor Who serial (production code LL)
- Leabhar Laighneach, a 12th-century Irish manuscript known in English as the Book of Leinster
- LL Cool J, American rapper-actor and Rock and Roll Hall of Fame inductee
- Trade mark of the 1864 in Paris founded firm Léon & Lévy specialized in stereoscopic views and postcards

== Science and technology ==
- Landline, telephone connection
- Laser lithotripsy, a surgical procedure using lasers to break down and remove kidney stones
- LibertyLink, a set of genes developed by Bayer
- Liquid limit, in geotechnical engineering
- Lincoln Laboratory, a US federally funded research and development center
- ll, a command to list files in long format in many Unix and Unix-like operating systems, as an alternative to ls -l
- LL parser, in computer science

== Transportation and places ==
- L (New York City Subway service), formerly designated LL
- Miami Air International, an airline (IATA code: LL)
- LL, the ICAO prefix for airports in Israel
- LL (short for "lower level", "lobby level", or similar), a storey of a building, generally below or slightly above the ground floor
- LL postcode area, UK, also known as the Llandudno postcode area, covering north Wales

== Sports ==
- Lumbini Lions, a professional Twenty20 cricket franchise representing Lumbini in the Nepal Premier League (NPL)
- La Liga, the top Spanish football league

== Other uses ==
- Lumber Liquidators, a US retailer of hardwood flooring
- "Extra large", a clothing size typically abbreviated "XL"
- Lebanese pound, abbreviated LL

== See also ==
- L&L (disambiguation)
- LLL (disambiguation)
- Il (disambiguation): Il
- II (disambiguation): II
- Vertical bars (disambiguation): ‖, ǁ, ∥, ||
