= L&L =

L&L, L & L, L.&L. or L. & L. may refer to:

- L&L Hawaiian Barbecue
- L & L Publishing, a publishing firm for magical literature by Larry Jennings and Louis Falanga
- Land&Liberty, a magazine published by the Henry George Foundation of Great Britain
- Language and Linguistics, a linguistics journal
- Lewd and lascivious behavior, a criminal offence
- Loyens & Loeff, a Dutch law firm
- Lynx and Lamb Gaede, an American white nationalist pop pre-teen duo
- Luke and Laura, fictional characters from the American TV drama General Hospital
- Course of Theoretical Physics, as an abbreviation for the authors' names "Landau and Lifshitz"

== See also ==
- LL (disambiguation)
- LNL (disambiguation)
