= List of The Colbert Report episodes (2005–06) =

- No. of episodes: 32 (2005); 161 (2006)

Release
- Original network: Comedy Central

Season chronology
- ← Previous; Season 5 Next → 2007 episodes

This is a list of episodes for The Colbert Report in 2005 and 2006.

== Development ==
In 2005, The Daily Show had won Primetime Emmy Awards, and Comedy Central wanted to expand the franchise. Producers were also looking for a way to hold on to Colbert, Daily Show correspondent and co-writer for six seasons, after the show's other breakout star, Steve Carell, left the program to pursue a successful career in film and network television. Jon Stewart and Ben Karlin (The Daily Show's executive producer) supposedly came up with the idea for The Colbert Report after watching coverage of the sexual harassment lawsuit filed against Bill O'Reilly. Jon Stewart's production company, Busboy Productions, developed The Report. Colbert, Stewart, and Karlin pitched the idea of the show (reportedly with one phrase: "our version of The O'Reilly Factor with Stephen Colbert") to Comedy Central chief Doug Herzog, who agreed to run the show for eight weeks without creating a pilot.

The Colbert Report first appeared in the form of three television commercials for itself which aired several times on The Daily Show, although the themes that form the basis for The Report can be seen in the reports of Colbert's correspondent character on The Daily Show. The show debuted on October 17, 2005, with an initial contract for an eight-week run. On November 2, 2005, based on the strong ratings for the show's first two weeks, Comedy Central and Colbert announced they had signed for an additional year, until the end of 2006.

== 2005 ==
=== October ===
No.	"The Wørd"	Guest(s)	Introductory phrase	Original release date	Prod. code
1	"Truthiness"	Stone Phillips	"Open wide, baby bird, because mama's got a big, fat nightcrawler of Truth."	October 17	101
Gravitas-Off versus Stone Phillips; Colbert salutes Peter Mayhew's U.S. citizenship with a Chewbacca figure.
2	"Bacchanalia"	Lesley Stahl	"Put some pants on, America. The Truth is knocking at the door."	October 18	102
Part one of "Better Know a District" with Rep. Jack Kingston (R) of Georgia's 1st congressional district; First All You Need to Know.
3	"Disappointed"	Fareed Zakaria	"Strap yourself in and flip the switch, 'cause you're about to get a Truthocution."	October 19	103
First "Tip of the Hat / Wag of the Finger"; First "Stephen Settles the Debate" (Whales and Cod vs. Eskimo Hunters and Seals); First The In-Box, where Stephen reads e-mails for viewers.
4	"Love Handles"	Jim Cramer	"Stop operating heavy machinery, because you're about to take two maximum strength tablets of Truth."	October 20	104
First appearance of Russ Lieber; Stephen replaces the U.S. Constitution with a framed credit card offer; Lisa Loeb has a cameo, singing a few bars of "Stay (I Missed You)"; First Un-American News.
5	"Pussy"	Lou Dobbs	"It's time to jump down, turn around and pick a bale of Truth."	October 24	105
First Out-of-Context Interview, with Kay Bailey Hutchison; First Appearance of "Bring Him Back or Keep him Dead," featuring Torquemada, Charles Darwin and Dave Thomas; a sequence on positive mugshots, in honor of Tom DeLay's arrest.
6	"Overrated"	Greg Behrendt	"I swallowed 20 condoms full of Truth and I'm about to smuggle them across the border."	October 25	106
The infamous anti-Rosa Parks speech; Introduces his black friend Alan; First mention of his undying hatred toward bears; Took calls from fake listeners for the first time; first appearance of Yet Another Day, the Colbert Report morning show.
7	"Perspective"	Neil deGrasse Tyson	"Strike up the klezmer and start acting like a man. You're about to have a Truth Mitzvah."	October 26	107
Introduction to Stephen's self-published Sci-fi novel Alpha Squad 7: Lady Nocturne: A Tek Jansen Adventure; First appearance of "The Pulse," where Stephen plays a video of one of his fans asking him a question. Today's included How is the weight of paper determined? and What's your favorite Jay-Z Song? (Stephen listed his top 20).
8	"Quitter"	Jeff Daniels	"Put on the Sade and spritz on some Musk. I'm gonna Truth you all night long."	October 27	108
Part two of "Better Know a District" with Rep. Barney Frank (D) of Massachusetts's 4th congressional district; Harriet Miers added to the Bookshelf of Broken Dreams.
9	"Alito"	Monica Crowley	"Shave off your body hair and put on your bike shorts. You just grabbed the yellow jersey in the Tour de Truth."	October 31	109
Second Out-of-Context Interview, with Patrick Fitzgerald; Stephen Settles the Debate: Ramadan vs. Halloween; Placed Rock and Roll nativity scene on his bookshelf to celebrate the end of "Rocktober."

=== November ===
No.	"The Wørd"	Guest(s)	Introductory phrase	Original release date	Prod. code
10	"Camilla-Mania"	Ken Burns	"Is that Truth in my pocket, or am I just happy to see you?"	November 1	110
The Colbert Report Emergency Evacuation Manual; Showing of documentary made about his interview with Ken Burns; first appearance of "Formidable Opponent" - Stephen debates himself on the topic of charity.
11	"Cat"	Bruce Feiler	"A wop bop a loo bop a wop bam Truth."	November 2	111
Stephen delights in a correction by The New York Times stating they had misreported The Colbert Report's first episode's "Word" as "trustiness" rather than "truthiness," and provides "cat" as this episode's "Word" so the Times will have something easy enough for them to get right. First "I called it" segment.
12	"Shhhh!..."	Bradley Whitford	"Get on your tippy toes America. You must be this tall to ride the TruthCoaster."	November 3	112
Part three of "Better Know a District" with Rep. Stephanie Tubbs Jones (D) of Ohio's 11th congressional district. Included a proposed TV show called Judge Tubbs. Also read from The In Box, and told us about an ongoing contest to guess what number he's thinking of. It's not: 7, 16, 111, 280 or 499. First time interview was conducted via satellite rather than in-studio; Whitford appeared surrounded by his Primetime Emmy Awards, which Colbert suggested could fight his award.
13	"Hoser"	Eliot Spitzer	"Somebody get a bucket, I think I'm gonna Truth!"	November 7	113
Rioting Do's and Don't's; Colbert marks premiere of The Colbert Report in Canada by welcoming Canadians as fellow "it-getters"; bears, the soulless killing machines, top the Threat Down once again.
14	"T.O."	Catherine Crier	"You want the Truth? You can't handle the Truth! But, I've got oven mitts!"	November 8	114
Stephen attacks bloggers for intercepting footage of him before he interviewed Bradley Whitford (first appearance of Ching Chong Ding Dong character); Stephen played the recording of the telephone call he got from the man he called his mentor, Wilford Brimley; Promo for Yet Another Day.
15	"Willy Loman"	Mary Roach	"Everyone put your keys in the bowl, it's time for a swinging Truth party!"	November 9	115
Stephen replaces Scott McClellan with Terrell Owens's agent, to do a better job repelling questions at a White House press conference; Part four of "Better Know a District," with Rep. John Mica (R) of Florida's 7th congressional district; another "All You Need to Know"; and a visit from the spirit of Jon Stewart, who tells us that the studio of the Report (formerly of The Daily Show) was built on an Indian burial ground.
16	"Armistice"	Cokie Roberts	"Hey Moondoggie, wax your board and catch a wave. The Truth's up."	November 10	116
Checked mail on The In Box, replayed offensive clip of his character Ching-Chong Ding-Dong, and solved all the world's mysteries with his word association system The DaColbert Code.
17	"Testosterone"	Bob Kerrey	"I'm fully dilated and effaced and I'm squeezing out a bouncing bundle of Truth."	November 14	117
Stephen paraphrases Country Music Award Nominees and places a chocolate portrait of Viggo Mortensen (bought on eBay) on his bookshelf to commemorate the 15th anniversary of the Internet.
18	"The Orient"	Al Sharpton	"Break out some vodka, some lime juice, and the facts. You're about to do an upside down Truthikaze."	November 15	118
Bring 'Em Back Or Leave 'Em Dead: Asian Edition; Formidable Opponent: Torture
19	"Information"	Matt Taibbi	"Get ready for authenticity, veracity, and verity. Someone's been reading a thesaurus." (first intro without the word "truth")	November 16	119
Stephen adds pant cuffs to the "On Notice" board but has to move New York Intellectuals to the "Dead to Me" board to make room; Part five of "Better Know a District" with Rep. Mark Udall (D) of Colorado's 2nd congressional district.
20	"McConaughey"	Tim Robbins	"Sharpen your carving knife and loosen your belt. You're coming over to my house for ThanksTruthing."	November 17	120
Colbert attacks Barney Frank for calling his show a waste of time; Stephen explores Matthew McConaughey's ego after he's named People Magazines Sexiest Man Alive; Threatdown; The Prescott Groups video 'Oil: Here Today, More Tomorrow.
21	"Never"	Brian Greene	"Go out ten yards then button hook to the left. I'm gonna hit you with a perfect spiral of Truth."	November 28	121
Stephen takes calls from "The Heroes"; Stephen Settles the Debate: Faith vs. Science.
22	"Confidence"	Richard Preston	"And they say the Truth still roams these very woods." (delivered with the studio lights off, lighting his face with a flashlight, using a creepy voice)	November 29	122
Stephen is brought to tears by the resignation of Randy "Duke" Cunningham. California's 50th congressional district is now "dead to him" and "Better Know a District" is now a 434 part series. Report is led in by the collapse of the Canadian Liberal government via a non-confidence vote. Also, he had a photo montage of Duke Cunningham's Things played at the end. First installment of "Was It Really That Bad?" on The Plague.
23	"Gay Gay Gay Gay Gay"	Katrina vanden Heuvel	"Knock knock. Who's there? The Truth. No joke."	November 30	123
Part six of "Better Know a District" with Rep. Carolyn Cheeks Kilpatrick (D) of Michigan's 13th congressional district; First installment of "Around the World in 11.6 Seconds."

=== December ===
No.	"The Wørd"	Guest(s)	Introductory phrase	Original release date	Prod. code
24	"Spectacle"	Richard Clarke	"Apply Truth liberally to the inflamed area."	December 1	124
Rick Springfield cameo; Stephen places a breast implant on his bookshelf to acknowledge the work of cosmetic surgeons.
25	"XMas"	Maureen Dowd	"Get ready to make a difference... by watching TV."	December 5	125
Stage manager Bobby moves one step closer to being fired for displaying the wrong graphic during a segment; Stephen confers the Colbert Nation Citizen Award upon Luis Soto for escaping from prison, supposedly because of Stephen's suggestion during the November 8 "Tip of the Hat / Wag of the Finger."
26	"Backsies"	Anderson Cooper	"Move over Oprah, tonight, every member of my audience receives a priceless gift: The Truth!"	December 6	126
Part seven of "Better Know a District" with Rep. Jim Moran (D) of Virginia's 8th congressional district.
27	"Hell, No!"	Craig Crawford	"Give me your tired, your poor, your huddled masses yearning to breathe free... but just for the next half-hour."	December 7	127
Stephen launches a "Campaign Against Humbuggery"; bears once again top the "Threat Down," followed by happy Germans, alien landing areas, the 9/11 Commission, wasps, popes, and threats.
28	"Satisfied?"	Peggy Noonan	"Don't touch that dial, and if your TV has a dial... go get a new TV."	December 8	128
First appearance of "Movies That Are Destroying America" ~~Holiday~~ Christmas Edition. Reviews included The Family Stone, Brokeback Mountain, and The Chronicles of Narnia: The Lion, the Witch and the Wardrobe.
29	"Belly Achin'"	Harry Smith	"Forgive me, Father, for I have Truthed."	December 12	129
Stephen reviews the history of various Christmas traditions. Plus, new editions of "Un-American News" and "The In Box."
30	"Lombardi"	Bob Costas	"Get some ice; I've pulled my groin... my enormous groin."	December 13	130
A Colbert Report Special Report: The De-Ballification of the American Sportscape; Stephen awards the report the Omnisport Award for Excellence in Everything.
31	"Travolta"	Dermot Mulroney	"Let's make this quick, our Christmas party's tonight."	December 14	131
Another "Tip of the Hat/Wag of the Finger"; Stephen puts the Hollywood Foreign Press Association on notice; Stephen explains the gifts that will be going in the stockings on his mantle, with The Heroes receiving an IOU for one Xbox 360 they will share collectively and the Blame America First crowd receiving Stephen's latest fragrance, Scorn.
32	"Jetpack"	Mark Cuban	"Children, get nestled all snug in your beds, while visions of Truth dance in your heads."	December 15	132
Part eight of "Better Know a District" with Rep. Major Owens (D) of New York's 11th District.

== 2006 ==
=== January ===
No.	"The Wørd"	Guest(s)	Introductory phrase	Original release date	Prod. code
33	""	Nancy Grace	"If beauty Truth and Truth beauty, then I look fabulous tonight."	January 9	2001
Stephen shows footage of his "appearance" on Late Night with Conan O'Brien, in which he is shot in the chest by O'Brien during a heated exchange about Rosa Parks; Stephen shows a clip from "Stephen Colbert's Hiphopketball: A Jazzebration"; Associate Visiting Professor Michael Adams of North Carolina State University is put on notice for mischaracterizing the word "truthiness", and AP writer Heather Clark is declared "dead to me" for neglecting to acknowledge Colbert as the originator of the word, in her coverage of its selection as Word of the Year by the American Dialect Society.
34	"Sleeper cell"	Carl Bernstein	"The Truth hurts; fortunately for America, I'm a masochist."	January 10	2002
Stephen congratulates Steven Van Zandt ("little Steven") for the E Street Band being taken off notice; first appearance of Stephen Colbert's Balls for Kidz.
35	"Whatever"	John Stossel	"I got 99 problems, but the Truth ain't one."	January 11	2003
The Threat-down: dads; robots; Virginia governor Mark Warner; bears; and the Associated Press; Stephen places a piggy bank stuffed with one US dollar as a commitment to financing the war in Iraq.
36	"Double-Stick Tape"	Kenneth Miller	"I scream, you scream, we all scream for the Truth."	January 12	2004
Part nine of "Better Know a District" with Rep. Steve Rothman (D) of New Jersey's 9th District; Michael Adams gets a phone call from Colbert, who accepts a (non-existent) apology.
37	"¡Cerrado!"	George Stephanopoulos	"Call me Fraulein Maria because the hills are alive with the sound of Truth."	January 16	2005
Films that are Destroying America: Colbert condemns Walk the Line and Pride and Prejudice, but says, though he hasn't seen it yet, Transamerica must be a great movie, because it has "America" right in the title, and whether you're a man or a woman, it seems to have something for everyone; Homage to Martin Luther King Jr.'s 1963 "I Have a Dream" speech, with a speech entitled "I Have a Dreamsicle", delivered in between taking bites of a dreamsicle, until he is suddenly stopped by brainfreeze, places unfinished Dreamsicle on bookshelf.
38	"Old School"	Andrew Sullivan	"Hey America, Nice Ass!"	January 17	2006
Tip of the Hat, Wag of the Finger: wag of the finger to Oregon for its physician-assisted suicide law, tip of the hat to the U.S. Supreme Court for upholding the law, so there will be fewer of those hippies from Oregon, "California's Canada." Second appearance of Wilford Brimley.
39	"Smarterer"	Frank McCourt	"I hope you brought a well-sharpened number Truth pencil."	January 18	2007
A Colbert Report Special Report: The De-Edumacation of the American Brainscape
40	"Public-See"	Nina Totenberg	"Stephen Colbert is Cool."	January 19	2008
First installment of "Who's attacking me now?" with the Humane Society in response to Stephen encouraging people to hunt bears; Part ten of "Better Know a District" with Rep. Eliot L. Engel (D) of New York's 17th congressional district, in which Colbert stuffs his face with breadsticks, repeatedly assumes Engel has accepted money from Jack Abramoff, and combs Engel's moustache.
41	"Charlie Daniels"	David Gregory	"I'm only going to say this once. (Lucky for you it will be rerun four times tomorrow.)"	January 23	2009
Hamas tops the Threat-down (and is subsequently put on notice) for "forming an alliance with bears" in a television show with which they are connected; after reading a study showing that a TV in the bedroom cuts frequency of sex in half, Colbert feels bad and makes it up to the viewers by reporting on the new Medicare Part D with the lights low and with much seductive innuendo. The gold fiddle in the episode is a reference to the Charlie Daniels song "The Devil Went Down to Georgia."
42	"Chernobyl"	Robin Givhan	"Pucker up America, because I'm going to kiss and tell... the Truth."	January 24	2010
Colbert debates President Bush's warrantless domestic spying program on Formidable Opponent; he catwalks as a model for "Stephen Colbert's Scorn" to welcome fashion writer Givhan; he apologizes to Hamas for falsely claiming they associate with the world's number one threat bears.
43	"Remote Control"	Norah Vincent	"There's a hole in every man the size of the Truth and I'm gonna jam it in there."	January 25	2011
Colbert takes credit for Stephen Harper's victory in the Canadian federal election (and thus "fixing" Canada); part eleven of "Better Know a District" with Rep. Bill Pascrell (D) of New Jersey's 8th District.
44	"Wham-O"	Paul Begala	"Let's change the world! But not the channel!"	January 26	2012
Russ Lieber accuses Colbert of never having been in the Marine Corps; first advertisement for the Colbert Cruise.
45	"Abortion/Unscripted"	Annie Duke	"I got my mojo working—mojo, of course, is what I call my assistant Monica Johnson."	January 30	2013
Colbert calls for a boycott of James Frey (the man, not his controversial book A Million Little Pieces) for upsetting Oprah Winfrey. Colbert celebrates the discussion of "truthiness" by Oprah and Frank Rich on her show, and by the hosts of Nightline. Colbert switched to the second Wørd "Unscripted" as he emulated George W. Bush's recent spate of casual appearances and launched into an "unscripted" question-and-answer session with the audience, which happened to feature an African-American, female, U.S. Marine and an Iraqi Kurd profusely thanking Colbert and exclaiming the greatness of America; "Tip of the Hat / Wag of the Finger" included a tip of the hat to paleontologists who discovered the fossil remains of effigia okeeffeae, an ancestor to crocodiles, for disproving the "Darwinlutionists" who tried to claim that every kind of creature had evolved from monkeys; also a wag of the finger to the same paleontologists, who named the extinct species after Georgia O'Keeffe, whose painting scares the hell out of Colbert, instead of after Edwin H. Colbert, who originally found the fossils.
46	"Jesi"	Dave Marash	"America, be amazed as I bend this spoon by using the power of my hand."	January 31	2014
Colbert listens to the State of the Union address while doing the show; first appearance of "The Craziest F#?king Thing I've Ever Heard." Colbert introduces his version of "what you need to know" news and mispronounces Senator Ted Stevens as Ted Williams, then laughs and says wish I could see it.

=== February ===
No.	"The Wørd"	Guest(s)	Introductory phrase	Original release date	Prod. code
47	"You're Welcome"	Emily Yoffe	"We've done forty-six episodes without a lost time accident."	February 1	2015
A Colbert Report Special Report: The American Worker: A Hero's Tribute to the Besieged Workers of the American Jobscape; Colbert salutes the crew behind the scenes - Bobby, Chief, Ace, Killer, and Billy (in reality an audience member); Colbert debates Russ Lieber on the subject of minimum wage.
48	"Aggravated assault"	Christine Todd Whitman	"I just saw my shadow — that means six more weeks of Truth!"	February 2	2016
Part twelve of "Better Know a District" with Rep. Jerrold Nadler (D) of New York's 8th District
49	"Metaphorically"	Senator Barbara Boxer	"Sometimes it takes a crazy person to see the Truth; if that's true, then I'm a freaking lunatic."	February 6	2017
Colbert commends Newsweek for putting him in the "golden corner" of the February 13, 2006, issue, where all the real stories are supposedly broken. ("Example:" golden corner of 1980s Newsweek reports on the assassination attempt on Ronald Reagan, while the cover story is about the more trivial Solid Gold Dancers.) Threat-down: Bees top the list because of collusion with bears through honey.
50	"Kidding"	James Woolsey	"How many roads must a man walk down before he's hit with an eighteen-wheeler of Truth?"	February 7	2018
Colbert mentions the ongoing Danish cartoon controversy and declares that he is against such vile depictions, because he fears for his life. In retaliation, he shows his own cartoons - stick figure versions of popular Danish icons depicted in ways that Danes would find insulting. Colbert places the last telegram he ever received to acknowledge Western Union's cancellation of its long-running service.
51	"Eureka"	Alan Dershowitz	"Please turn your cellphones and pagers to silent or vibrate; no joke, it's just inconsiderate."	February 8	2019
Colbert mocks the USA's low student achievement in science. Part thirteen of "Better Know a District" with Rep. Chaka Fattah (D) of Pennsylvania's 2nd District.
52	"U.S.A.! U.S.A.!"	George Packer	"Hope you haven't eaten in the last thirty minutes America, because you're about to go swimming in the deep end of the Truth."	February 9	2020
Colbert awards Rep. John Boehner (R) Stephen's Balls for running a lobbyist reform campaign to become House Majority Leader, despite the fact that his publicly known address is rented from a Washington lobbyist; Stephen notably breaks character by laughing while crossing names of celebrities being married (specifically, William H. Macy and Felicity Huffman = Filliam H. Muffman), but eventually recovers; Stephen ends the show with a clip of a love ballad by his former band, "Stephen and the Colberts", entitled "Charlene (I'm Right Behind You)" full of not-so-subtle messages implying he's stalking her.
53	"U.S.A.? U.S.A.?"	Lama Surya Das	"Mark your calendars America, I'm turning February twenty-one into February twenty-wow!"	February 21	2021
"Megamerican" replaces "Grippy" in the opening sequence; Colbert shows a fake interview with Brit Hume and implores his viewers to harass Fox News to air the interview; Colbert shows off his tattooed knuckles that feature the names of Bode Miller and Michelle Kwan; part fourteen of "Better Know a District" profiling New Jersey's 13th District, which is currently vacant; Colbert places a sample of his DNA on his bookshelf to celebrate the 53rd anniversary of its discovery.
54	"Absolutely Maybe"	Michael Eric Dyson	"It's George Washington's birthday, and I cannot tell a lie. The previous statement was false."	February 22	2022
Colbert puts his brother Ed on notice for failing to give the Report rights to air press conference footage of the disputes between American speed skaters Chad Hedrick and Shani Davis. He then acts out the conferences using a water pipe to represent Hedrick and a hooker doll as Davis. Number five on the Threat-down was gay adoption. Roommates topped the Threat-down, though as toilet paper was the cause of one roommate murdering another, bears are involved through brand Charmin (parodied on the show as "Harmin'").
55	"Hippocratical"	David Brooks	"Side effects of tonight's show may include euphoria, patriotism and painful urination."	February 23	2023
Colbert apologizes for not mentioning bears in the previous Threat-down after a woman is attacked by a bear at a Canadian hockey game. Tonight's bonus Threat-down includes only the number one spot, held by bears; Colbert asserts that "they will kill you." Colbert gives his own version of the White House's Katrina report.
56	"Trial Separation"	Tony Campolo	"Demon of facts, begone!"	February 27	2024
A Colbert Report Special Report: The De-Deification of the American Faithscape
57	"Laissez Les Bons Temps Roulez"	Brett O'Donnell	"Wanna prepare the perfect Truthtini? That's two parts vodka, no part fact."	February 28	2025
"Who's attacking me now?": Jon Friedman of MarketWatch claims that Yahoo! News has as little chance as the Report of winning a Pulitzer. In response, Colbert pulls out his various Peabody Awards and Primetime Emmy Awards.

=== March ===
No.	"The Wørd"	Guest(s)	Introductory phrase	Original release date	Prod. code
58	"Faith"	Arianna Huffington	"America, bend over and relax, you're about to get a Truthoscopic examination."	March 1	2026
The debut of a new segment, "Better Know a Founder." Stephen introduces the "Never Existed to Me" list, in which the first entry is California's 50th district, which had been represented by Randy "Duke" Cunningham. During the Huffington interview, when Stephen says he is 'Truthiness's father, to which she points out that Wikipedia acknowledges him as not the father but who helped popularize it to which he replies "F**k 'em."
59	"Homo Sapien Agenda"	Jeffrey Sachs	"And the Truth goes to... America!"	March 2	2027
Colbert (correctly) predicts Academy Award winners Rachel Weisz, Reese Witherspoon, George Clooney, Philip Seymour Hoffman, and Crash with the DaColbert Code.
60	"Spoiler Alert"	Bob Schieffer	"What you're about to see contains graphic violence, adult situations and scenes of full frontal Truth."	March 6	2028
Bears absent from the Threat-down for the second week in a row. Colbert proposes to mate various blond celebrities to enhance their blondedness. Colbert boasts in an "I Called It" segment his correct predictions (with the DaColbert Code) for Oscar winners.
61	"The Long War"	Norman Ornstein	"Ladies and gentlemen, boys and girls, come one, come all, step right up and marvel at the exotic and the mysterious freak show. It walks, it talks, it crawls on its belly like a reptile. No photographs, no paper maché; it is... the Truth."	March 7	2029
"All You Need to Know" returns. Stephen implores Sir Benjamin Slade, a British man searching for an American heir, to give his estate to him.
62	"Monopoly"	James H. Webb, Jr.	"Focus on the spot on the wall and breathe over the contractions. This truth's coming out headfirst."	March 8	2030
First appearance of "Stephen's Sound Advice." Stephen gives advice to Iraqis on how to fight a civil war.
63	"D.I.Y."	Lorraine Bracco	"You're about to enter another dimension - a dimension not only of sight and sound, but of Truth. There's a signpost up ahead. Next stop, The Colbert Report."	March 9	2031
Part fifteen of "Better Know a District" with Rep. Linda Sánchez (D) of California's 39th congressional district.
64	"Sidney Poitier"	Christopher Buckley	"Never mind the bollocks, this is The Colbert Report!"	March 13	2032
The Colbert Report calls the 2008 United States presidential election in favor of Bill Frist, the first news show to do so. Colbert also predicts that a war will be waged against Iran by then.
65	"Scapegoat"	Keith Olbermann	"Light the lamp and put the biscuit in the basket, this is SportsCenter... Nope, this is The Colbert Report!"	March 14	2033
"Was It Really That Bad?" on the days before the rise of labor unions. Stephen shows a clip from his new documentary, "Hiphopketball 2: The Rejazzebration '06 Remix" featuring an appearance by Kareem Abdul-Jabbar.
66	"None of the Above"	Al Franken	"Warmth is to sun as Truth is to me."	March 15	2034
Colbert takes credit for being "donor 401", a popular, but now-retired sperm donor.
67	"Sweet Dreams"	Frank Vincent	"I'm here to fight for justice and the American way. My weapon? The Truth!"	March 16	2035
In response to a comment made by Orlando Sentinel columnist Commander Coconut, Stephen reveals that he can fold his right ear into his head. He also states, during his interview with Frank Vincent, that his "balls are waxed." Part 1 of "Better Know a Protectorate" with Rep. Donna Christian-Christensen (D) of the U.S. Virgin Islands district at large.
68	"Stop It"	Connie Chung	"From the creators of The Colbert Report, this is The Colbert Report."	March 20	2036
First instance where Colbert has removed items from his bookshelf. In this case, Jessica Simpson merchandise including her album Sweet Kisses and his pair of Daisy Dukes, in response to Simpson declining an offer to speak at a Republican Party fundraiser.
69	"Eat It"	Steve Kroft	"In vino veritas, and I am hammered!"	March 21	2037
Colbert considers Japan's victory in the World Baseball Classic a victory for the United States by proxy; performance reviews of staff members Bobby, Jimmy, and Killer are done on-air; Colbert corrects a number of factual errors from recent episodes during "the In-Box."
70	"I am the Great and Powerful Oz"	Dan Senor	"Truth hurts, and this is gonna be agonizing."	March 22	2038
Part sixteen of "Better Know a District" with Rep. Brad Sherman (D) of California's 27th congressional district. Colbert repeatedly references the San Fernando Valley's pornography industry, flustering the representative. A pornography spoof is also present in which a pizza delivery man "unexpectedly" arrives. This harkens back, most likely intentionally, to a 2004 episode of The Colbert Report's sister show The Daily Show in which Stephen also investigated the porn industry, that time on the porn industry's funding of the GOP's 2004 re-election campaign. Stephen repeatedly ran into the same pizza guy during interviews, with similar occurrences to those that happened in this episode happening to Stephen, the pizza guy, and his interviewees. The episode is notable for the fact that "The Wørd" segment did not air until the second "act" of the show.
71	"None"	John Kasich	"Mr. Stephen Colbert requests the pleasure of your company on the occasion of his latest television program."	March 23	2039
A Colbert Report Special Report: Home, Hearth, Heart & Heartland: A Return to Traditional Values. The normal theme music is replaced by Colbert on guitar and leading the audience in "This Land Is Your Land." Judith Martin (better known as Miss Manners) appears as a special correspondent. Colbert gives "Stephen's Sound Advice" to parents on how to raise a hero. This is also the first episode in which a "The Wørd" segment does not appear.
72	"Tense"	Gary Hart	"In the future you will be able to inject this program directly into your eyeballs; the future is now!"	March 27	2040
Colbert halts his sperm merchant business due to excess demand.
73	"Marketing"	Michael D. Brown	"The world is a dirty place, and I'm America's lemon-scented wet nap."	March 28	2041
Colbert announces that the San Francisco Zoo is planning on naming a newborn bald eagle Stephen Jr. in his honor; Russ Lieber debates Colbert on the issue of school vouchers, and ends up confessing his love for "quadrapalegic gay men in wheel chairs, holding babies."
74	"Merrier"	Bruce Bartlett	"This isn't a bald spot, it's a solar panel on a Truth machine."	March 29	2042
Colbert predicts the Apocalypse because of a recent solar eclipse and endorses polygamy in "The Wørd". Part seventeen of "Better Know a District" with Rep. Adam Schiff (D) of California's 29th congressional district.
75	"F#@k"	Robert Greenwald	"It's the last show of March. I came in like a lion and I'm going out like a lamb-fed lion."	March 30	2043
Colbert updates journalist Jill Carroll on what's happened in the world while she was held captive. Women's History Month is celebrated by honoring Soledad O'Brien. Tip of the Hat / Wag of the Finger: wag for giving the Templeton Prize to a scientist, tip to Canada, wag to Victor Willis. Colbert encourages viewers to download episodes of the show from the iTunes Music Store.

=== April ===
No.	"The Wørd"	Guest(s)	Introductory phrase	Original release date	Prod. code
76	"Stay the Course"	Michael Smerconish	"It's baseball's opening day - any rebroadcast or reproduction of this telecast without the express written consent of Major League Baseball is prohibited."	April 3	2044
Stephen's Sound Advice: Taxes (sponsored by Nutz, the pistachio-flavored soda). Nutz was previously featured in a segment on The Daily Show in which Stephen also gave tax advice.
77	"Birdie"	Rev. Jesse Jackson	"Viewers of this show unite! We have nothing to lose but the facts."	April 4	2045
Colbert retires the Texas' 22nd Congressional District from the "Better Know a District" board in honor of Rep. Tom DeLay's resignation. On "Stephen Colbert's Balls -- For Kidz", Plastic Surgery.
78	"Martyr"	Harvey Mansfield	"Let's see... Five letter word, "Proven to be accurate"... Hmm, you got me."	April 5	2046
Colbert visibly mourned Katie Couric retiring The Today Show for the CBS Evening News and Meredith Vieira leaving The View. "Formidable Opponent" - Immigration.
79	"Nazis"	Markos Moulitsas	"In thirty minutes, I'll be on a helicopter to Barbados. This is The Colbert Report."	April 6	2047
Complained about being passed over by the Peabody Award Committee. Part eighteen of "Better Know a District" with Rep. Darlene Hooley (D) of Oregon's 5th District.
80	"None"	Reza Aslan	"I've been yelling this in the mirror all week: this is The Colbert Report!"	April 17	2048
"Lincolnish" replaces "Megamerican" in the title sequence. Proposed a boycott of the dime, claiming that FDR was a "tax-loving mental cripple." Two changes to the On Notice Board, Journal of Paleolimnology replaces Fabergé eggs, and Todd Rundgren replaces business casual. "Was It Really That Bad?" discusses 1906 earthquake in San Francisco. In another installment of "The Craziest F#?king Thing I've Ever Heard", Colbert reports on scientists who created eyeglasses for a housefly. The second Colbert Report episode without a Special Report where "The Wørd" wasn't aired.
81	"Sir, Yes, Sir"	Anthony Romero	"Do you really exist or are you merely a figure in one of my dreams? Either way, this is The Colbert Report!"	April 18	2049
Announced the hatching of the baby bald eagle named after him at the San Francisco Zoo. Yelled at the Pulitzer Prize committee for being passed over, and compared giving Louisiana papers Pulitzers for Hurricane Katrina coverage to giving Oscars to actors playing the mentally handicapped. Threat-down: Judas, Wal-Mart, Neil Young, robots, "Winnie the Bear."
82	"Save It"	Caitlin Flanagan	"Don't have a cow man, dyn-o-myte, aaaay, I'm the Fonz, what'choo talkin' 'bout, Willis? This is The Colbert Report!"	April 19	2050
Scolded PBS for their "pro-bear agenda". Tip of the Hat / Wag of the Finger: Tip - Nebraska state legislature for its dividing of school boards along race lines; Wag - Eel catfish for "giving the Darwin-huggers another bullet in their gun"; Tip - TomKat for their birth; Wag - TomKat for "trying to steal his thunder" about their birth. Stephen then consumes the remains of the egg "Stephen, Jr." hatched out of, in response to both this as well as Tom Cruise's joking declaration to eat the placenta of his newborn daughter.
83	"Bard"	Ralph Nader	"Is this The Colbert Report? The answer may surprise you. This is The Colbert Report!"	April 20	2051
Part nineteen of "Better Know a District": profiled Rep. Albert Wynn (D) of Maryland's 4th District. After updating the "Better Know a District" board, Colbert notes that it looks like he's broadcasting from space. After nobody laughs, he adds, "I could be alone in that feeling."
84	"None"	Hugh Hewitt	"This weekend, Hippies celebrated Earth Day; maybe one day they'll celebrate Jobs Day."	April 24	2052
Colbert Report Special Report: "Money and Politics - The Machine That Ain't Broke." Also in this episode, Tad, the building manager reappeared in an attempt to save his job by winning Stephen items at an auction of former Republican member of the United States House of Representatives from California's 50th District, Duke Cunningham. The auction report mirrored similar segments that are common on The Daily Show in which a correspondent goes on location for a special investigation in a pre-taped format. Colbert himself frequently did these in his time on The Daily Show. This marks the first time a segment such as this has been featured on The Colbert Report.
85	"Panama"	Sam Harris	"How many pundits does it take to cover the news? Three: Me, Myself and I!"	April 25	2053
Attempted to make contact with the spirit of John Lennon through electronic voice phenomena. Threat-down: Senator Arlen Specter for suggesting taxing oil company profits, Illinois for attempting to force impeachment of President Bush, LL Cool J for thwarting "irresponsible spending by rappers that fuels the economy", Federal Express for funding a grizzly bear exhibit in the Memphis Zoo, Tom Hanks for his starring role in The Da Vinci Code.
86	"English"	Sebastian Junger	"To make tonight's show more memorable, I've composed the following jingle: This is The Colbert Report!"	April 26	2054
Announced that Colbert Nation was now a nuclear power, "in an arms race with Hannity & Colmes." On the 20th installment of "Better Know a District", Georgia's 11th Congressional District, interviewing Rep. Phil Gingrey, (R-GA).
87	"White Gloves (the "real word": "Sit, Scratch")"	William Kristol	"I've got truth fever... Seriously, I've been throwing up all day."	April 27	2055
"All You Need to Know" returns after a long hiatus.

=== May ===
No.	"The Wørd"	Guest(s)	Introductory phrase	Original release date	Prod. code
88	"Drug-Fueled Sex Crime"	Jon Meacham	"It's May-Day, and I'm wrapping ribbons of truth around America's pole."	May 1	2056
Tip of the Hat / Wag of the Finger: Tip - Exxon for making the 5th largest profits by a corporation ever; Wag - Mahmoud Ahmadinejad for allowing women in Iran to watch soccer games; Wag - Doonesbury for its portrayal of B.D.'s post-Iraq therapy; Wag - Chicago for banning foie gras. In honor of the 28th anniversary of spam, placed punched cards with the message on his shelf.
89	"Healthy Appetite"	Mike Huckabee	"I bring you the unvarnished truth, though it's lightly stained and buffed with a Danish oil."	May 2	2057
Showed his audition tape for White House Press Secretary, a lengthy sketch first shown at the White House Correspondents' Dinner that ends with him being chased by Helen Thomas, parodying many horror movie chase scenes - for example, in trying to enter his car, he repeatedly fumbles and drops his keys.
90	"Name Game"	Paul Rieckhoff	"When life gets you down, don't get mad... Get Stephen."	May 3	2058
Banned "my black friend Alan", sending him to "Alan Town", "where all my banned Alans go, including Alan Colmes, Alan Alda, Alan Franken, Alan Gore, and Alan, Woody", and downgraded Alan to "my black acquaintance Alan." Received a "personal bear deterrent" from Michael Chertoff. Stephen's Sound Advice: surviving high gas prices. Premieres a "special bonus to Better Know a District": "Betterer Know a District." The premiere: Rep. Phil Gingrey recalling lines from Gone with the Wind; Colbert replies to the clip, "As God as my witness, we will never show that clip again."
91	"Indulgence"	Rick Reilly	"We're holding our spring formal and my date is the truth. Tonight, we're going all the way."	May 4	2059
21st installment of "Better Know a District": Oregon's 3rd District, interviewing Rep. Earl Blumenauer, (D-OR).
92	"Not"	Shere Hite	"Due to my unauthorized spreading of the truth, I've been forced into the Witness Protection Program. This is the Silverman Report."	May 8	2060
Scolded the San Francisco Zoo for, as he perceived, having two male eagles raise Stephen, Jr. ThreatDown: Salaries! (for housewives); There is no Threat #4!; The Pope! (for the Vatican permitting the use of condoms based on scientific study); The Geography Police! (for being alarmist in reporting the poor knowledge of geography in the American public); Bears! (They're back! A crossbreed between a grizzly and a polar bear found in Canada, the pizzly.) Introduces his "Condon'ts". At the conclusion of the show, Stephen got a thank you from his audience, and said, "You're very welcome", a subtextual response to the Thank You Stephen Colbert website.
93	"Superegomaniac"	Frank Rich	"There are three doors; behind one is a tiger, another is the truth, and the last is a closet. Choose wisely."	May 9	2061
Movies That Are Destroying America (Summer Blockbuster Edition): An Inconvenient Truth ("Blame Humans First" agenda), Hoot (anti-development), Over the Hedge (instructional video for illegal immigrants), Mission: Impossible III, pronounced as "Miiii" (for giving out "our nation's spy secrets"), recommends Akeelah and the Bee.
94	"Athletes Are Above The Law"	William Bastone	"I'm a steamroller of truth, repaving the highway of the future. Expect delays."	May 10	2062
Premiered the Report's new report on the avian influenza: "Death From Above: Bird Flu Is Going To Kill Everyone."; The 22nd edition of "Better Know a District", Nebraska's 2nd Congressional District, interviewing Rep. Lee Terry, (R-NE).
95	"Fill 'Er Up"	Madeleine Albright	(Inhales helium from a balloon) "This is The Colbert Report."	May 11	2063
Suggested to President Bartlet to pardon The A-Team before The West Wing goes off the air to "secure his TV president legacy." Colbert begins reselling a limited supply of Formula 401, for Russians only, in response to Russian President Vladimir Putin's efforts to increase Russia's fertility rate. Tip of the Hat / Wag of the Finger: Wag - Huntsville, Alabama, school district for suspending students who paid a homeless man to walk the halls of their school without pants; Wag - U.S. Mint for announcing that it costs more to make pennies and nickels than they're worth (followed up with a suggestion to remove all currency and go back to trading in gold); Wag and Tip - Jesus for not putting enough detail in his latest "appearance" in a rock in Mexico, but at the same time testing Colbert's faith.
96	"Lunchables"	Kevin Phillips	"When I think about the truth, I touch myself. This is The Colbert Report!"	May 15	2064
Introduced a new service: "Stephen Colbert's Executive Book Summaries Summaries", a summary of summaries of executive books. A brand new "All You Need To Know" with Dick Cheney, Gen. Michael V. Hayden, immigration, hurricanes. "The Craziest F#?ing Thing I've Ever Heard" - A man pulling a truck with his ear "as a solution to high gas prices."
97	"Inoculation"	Tyson Slocum	"Males aged 18–34 with disposable income, prepare to have your purchasing habits swayed."	May 16	2065
Mentioned his "Native American friend", "gay (in a way he can handle) friend", and "little person friend" (who was also his "Latino friend") and asked for applications to be his new "black friend." Revealed that the Colbert Report eagle is named "Liberty" (the one used in advertising, the logo, and the videos in the background, which is not his "son"). Placed his body parts on the auction block; his gall bladder was first to be sold, for $100.
98	"Democrats"	Jonathan Alter	"I'm America's Dairy Queen, giving you the soft serve news in a crunchy coating of opinion. Would you like Truth with that?"	May 17	2066
Condemned some leading Republican opponents of the border security plan for acting like Democrats; spurred by the success of the "Better Know a District" series, debuted the 43-part series "Better Know a President" with first installment Theodore Roosevelt.
99	"Libya"	Ted Daeschler	"I am The Walrus, Goo goo ka Truth."	May 18	2067
Colbert launches "Stephen Colbert's Guardian Eagles" to oversee prom week activities; first installment of "The Difference Makers."

=== June ===
No.	"The Wørd"	Guest(s)	Introductory phrase	Original release date	Prod. code
100	"Me"	Stone Phillips	None	June 5	2068
Stephen celebrates his 100th episode; Stephen looks at how he has changed the world; Stone Phillips becomes the first repeat guest and faces Stephen in a Gravitas-Off rematch. This the first episode in which there is no introductory phrase before the title sequence.
101	"Military"	Christiane Amanpour	"It's 6-6-6, and this show contains many Satanic backmasked messages. tropeR trebloC ehT si sihT." ("This is The Colbert Report" spoken backwards)	June 6	2069
Expressed worry about the date, and put holy water, a crucifix, and a copy of the Bible on his shelf. Once the date was nearly over, he replaced them with a stolen shrunken head and an iPod that "plays only a video of the owner's death" and The Black Eyed Peas' "My Humps." He then attempted to flip the page on a calendar and received a paper cut.
102	"Big Deal"	Steve Squyres	"When the world tries to shake us up, I'm America's bubble wrap."	June 7	2070
Threat-down: "Ivy Leaguers!" (for cloning through stem cells, thus creating "an army of intellectuals"), "Bad Heroin!", "U.S. Diplomats!" (for offering Iran nuclear technology), "Repetitive Corporate Sponsorships!" (for the Miami Heat's AmericanAirlines Arena vs. the Dallas Mavericks' American Airlines Center), "Conservationists!" (for bringing "Frogs on a Plane"), "and oh, yeah, bears."
103	"Gooooaaaaal!"	Steven Johnson	"Life is a crap shoot, and I'm your loaded dice."	June 8	2071
Conducted fake interview with Tom DeLay by splicing in his words from three separate interviews for the 23rd installment of "Better Know a District." Put his honorary doctorate from Knox College on bookshelf along with pictures of TV doctors Noah Drake from General Hospital, Gregory House from House, and Cliff Huxtable from The Cosby Show. Credits list Producer Dr. Stephen Colbert.
104	"Tom DeLay's Farewell Speech"	Robert F. Kennedy, Jr.	"By the power of Grayskull, this is The Colbert Report."	June 12	2072
Colbert places Mort Zuckerman On Notice (replacing "the sea") after U.S. News & World Report sent a fax claiming that he misstated Zuckerman's position on tax cuts. Tip of the Hat / Wag of the Finger: Wag - College Students.
105	"Great F**king Idea"	Tim Flannery	"This show may be recorded for quality assurance. This... is The Colbert Report."	June 13	2073
106	"License Renewal"	David Sirota	"Loosen your belts, America, I'm gonna force feed you truth like grain down a goose's gullet."	June 14	2074
Better Know A District: Lynn Westmoreland (R-GA) from Georgia's 8th; Stephen gives American flags and bibles to the audience and displays a self-waving American flag that also plays patriotic songs.
107	"Lock & Load"	Michael Pollan	"There's a vicious rumor going around that this is not The Colbert Report, but let me assure you, this is The Colbert Report."	June 15	2075
Stephen talks about more applicants for his new black friend, but then reconciles with Alan (and takes a new picture with him); the return of "Formidable Opponent" with detaining suspected terrorists in Guantanamo Bay Naval Base; Stephen adds a Wendy's "Great Biggie" to his bookshelf, as its name was changed to "large."
108	"Risky Business"	Gustavo Arellano	"I'm going through America's trash separating the white glass of truth from the green glass of facts."	June 19	2076
Stephen releases his new sperm, "Formula 402", in response to the finding that risky actions are caused by genes. The Threat-down, Homo-Sexy Edition (because of Gay Pride Week): gay superheroes, Cirque du Soleil, the World Cup, the Ex-Gay Movement, desirable men (giving Brad Pitt as an example), and the "other #1 threat", bears.
109	"Everything Must Go"	Bart Ehrman	"And now, the ten-time winner of the Stephen Colbert Award for Journalistic Excellence, this is The Colbert Ro... Oh shit!"	June 20	2077
Colbert was accidentally about to say "Ro-pert" and then cursed when he realized his mistake; after the opening credits he says, "The name of the show is not The Colbert Ro-shit. First installment of "Stephen Makes it Simple", with big government and small government.
110	"None"	Bay Buchanan	"Today is the summer solstice, the longest day of the year. But what really matters is... how thick is it?"	June 21	2078
Alexi Lalas helps Stephen trash talk other teams in the World Cup.
111	"Cut and Run"	Doug Brinkley	"This is The Colbert Report, or for our foreign viewers: THIS IS THE COLBERT REPORT!"	June 22	2079
Better Know A District: Diana DeGette (D) from Colorado's 1st
112	"Class Warfare"	Mark Bowden	"Still waiting for my invitation, Nicole and Keith. This is The Colbert Report."	June 26	2080
Colbert places a Highlights for Children magazine on his bookshelf in honor of the printing of its one billionth copy.
113	"Cold, Dead Fingers"	Chris Matthews	"We now return you to The Colbert Report, already in progress."	June 27	2081
Movies That Are Destroying America: Stephen scorns 'A Scanner Darkly', suspects transsexuality in 'Barnyard', expresses how much he hates "Pirates of the Caribbean: Dead Man's Chest", and recommends that everybody see Strangers with Candy multiple times at full price.
114	"Superman"	Robert Baer	"I had an acting class this week, and it's really paid off: this is The Colbert Report."	June 28	2082
Citizens in Action: Fondue It Yourself. Segment with Cassie Ramoska and Ricky Faust as citizen journalists. Robert Baer (ex-CIA) discusses his new "fictional" book.
115	"Monkey Butter"	Christopher Noxon	"Happy Birthday, America. You may be 230, but if you were a dog, you'd only be 32... but you'd be dead 'cause dogs don't live that long. This is The Colbert Report."	June 29	2083
Profiled a fireworks salesman in The Difference Makers; said "goodbye" to the Supreme Court; left the show (for the week) in solidarity with Star Jones leaving The View.

=== July ===
No.	"The Wørd"	Guest(s)	Introductory phrase	Original release date	Prod. code
116	"Silver Foxes"	Amy Sedaris	"I don't think Barry Manilow looks this good in a suit. This is The Colbert Report!"	July 10	2084
Stephen celebrated the US victory in the 2006 FIFA World Cup claiming that since Italy never beat the US, just tied, they were just as good as the victors. Stephen's Sound Advice on wildfires. On guest interview, Colbert displays his tumbling prowess for the first time with his guest Sedaris and his building manager Tad (played by Paul Dinello, who co-wrote and starred with Amy and Stephen on Strangers with Candy).
117	"Psychopharmaparenting"	Tony Hawk	"Now zip it and cop a squat, little mister, or you are grounded for a week. This is The Colbert Report!"	July 11	2085
"Our Kids: What The Hell Is Wrong With Them?" He skateboards from desk to a 1970s-esque rec room complete with beanbag chairs and shag carpeting.
118	"The America Conventions"	Mort Zuckerman	"They say only drunks and children tell the truth. Guess which one I am."	July 12	2086
Colbert outlines his plan to save traditional marriage by stating that gay marriage should be banned in 49 states and legalized only in Massachusetts so all the gays will flock there. Better Know a District: Rick Larsen of Washington's 2nd. Colbert removes Mort Zuckerman from the "On Notice" board after Zuckerman apologized during the interview.
119	"Inquisition"	Ron Suskind	"Spoiler Alert. This is The Colbert Report!"	July 13	2087
Threat Down; Canadian pharmaceuticals, fake sperm, Jackie Chan, rogue waves and Magnamorphs (because bear pieces are included; giving kid's the ability to morph "our proud American Symbol of Freedom [eagle] into a godless killing machine).
120	"T&A"	Lee Silver	"You're in for a real treat tonight... if you are watching this show from an ice cream parlor. This is The Colbert Report!"	July 17	2088
Colbert announces he received his first donation for his new charity, the Stephen & Melinda Gates Foundation. Also, Tip of the Hat / Wag of the Finger; Tips to Iraqi TV for their American Idol-esque Iraqi Star and to aliens for their 3-D crop circles. Wags to Arizona for their new voter lottery and Wal-mart's new policy regarding shoplifting for items under $25.
121	"Solidarity"	Dhani Jones	"We've got a coast to coast heatwave, but luckily I'm America's biggest fan... This is The Colbert Report!"	July 18	2089
Colbert debuts his new one-part series: "Stephen Colbert's Problems Without Solutions" about a zookeeper who handles bears.
122	"R-E-S-P-E-C-T"	Joe Scarborough	"I don't have a truth problem. I tell the truth, I fall down, no problem. This is The Colbert Report."	July 19	2090
Colbert provides a different view on global warming with his PowerPoint presentation/"top-grossing documentary" The Convenientest Truth.
123	"None"	Tom Brokaw	"The special ingredient in tonight's show? It's love, this is The Colbert Report."	July 20	2091
Stephen reads his mail from people who want to be his new black friend. He interviews Julian Bond, Chairman of the NAACP, asking advice on how to choose his new black friend. He also interviews Congressman Robert Wexler of the 19th District of Florida.
124	"Moral Minority"	Howell Raines	"I'm America's watchdog: I'm vigilant, I see the world in black and white, and I eat liver and bacon. This is The Colbert Report."	July 24	2092
Stephen proclaims America's latest victories in the British Open, the Tour de France, and Miss Universe. Threat Down: Camp Quest; Other People's Religion In Schools; LaPorte, Indiana; M. Night Shyamalan; Kix.
125	"Opposite Day"	William A. Donohue	"I regret that I have but one half-hour to shout at my country. This is The Colbert Report."	July 25	2093
Stephen lampoons Good Morning America and The Today Show for their coverage of his recent interview with Congressman Robert Wexler. Formidable Opponent: Stem-cell research.
126	"Democrazy"	Neal Katyal	"On my show, it's always Shark Week. Enemies of America, you are the chum. This is The Colbert Report."	July 26	2094
John Stossel says there is nothing wrong with cousins marrying each other (and apparently Charlene is Stephen's cousin), Mission plan concocted for Killer, Bobby, and Ric Ocasek to rescue Stephen Jr., Stephen's Sound Advice: Power Failure.
127	"Secretary-General Bolton"	Joe Quesada	"I'm packing America's lunch box with a truth roll-up. This is The Colbert Report"	July 27	2095
Better Know A District: Eleanor Holmes Norton of Washington, D.C. At the end of the interview, Marvel Comics Editor-In-Chief Quesada gives Stephen the shield of Captain America.
128	"Wikiality"	Ned Lamont	(while ringing a bell) "By now you should be trained to salivate whenever you hear... This is The Colbert Report."	July 31	2096
In "The WØRD", Colbert defines "Wikiality" (a portmanteau of "Wikipedia" and "reality") as "truth by consensus" (rather than fact), modeled after the approval-by-consensus format of Wikipedia. He praises Wikipedia for following his philosophy of "truthiness", that intuition and consensus is a better reflection of reality than fact. As he states, "if enough people believe something", it must be true. He also calls on people to edit Wikipedia so it says certain things, for instance, that the elephant population had tripled in six months. As a result, many of the topics Colbert mentioned, as well as numerous Colbert-related topics, were temporarily protected.

=== August ===
No.	"The Wørd"	Guest(s)	Introductory phrase	Original release date	Prod. code
129	"Uncool"	Peter Beinart	"The following program is rated 'T' for... This is The Colbert Report."	August 1	2097
Stephen sets a special place for Joe Lieberman and describes incentives he will give him if he comes on the show. Discusses Castro's health. The third installment of "Stephen Colbert's Balls - For Kidz" teaches kids about carnivals.
130	"Single Serving"	Linda Hirshman	"Hey Mom, check it out! I'm on TV! This is The Colbert Report."	August 2	2098
Joe Lieberman did not "show up" for his interview, so Stephen takes calls from viewers instead. One caller complained about the "Wikiality" episode, stating he could not edit elephant because it was protected. During the interview segment with Linda Hirshman, Colbert claimed that latchkey kids all grew up to be crazy, implying that he read it on Wikipedia. Hirshman then said that if Wikipedia didn't state such a thing before, it most likely soon would.
131	"None"	Paul Hackett	None	August 3	2099
Colbert Report Special Report: "War: What It's Good For". David Cross appears again as Russ Lieber. First installment of Meet an Ally: Palau. This is the first episode that has neither a Wørd nor an introductory phrase.
132	"Ten-Hut!"	William C. Rhoden	"We're reaching America's youth, nation! Check it out!" (a child then says from his high chair, "This is The Colbert Report!")	August 8	2100
Stephen projects the Connecticut primary result by projecting that Joe Lieberman will not appear on his show. Stephen gives interior decorating advice for the White House press room. First episode of the animated series Stephen Colbert's Alpha Squad 7: The New Tek Jansen Adventures. Stephen finally attempts to check in with Jon Stewart and The Daily Show.
133	"Pencils Down"	Alexandra Robbins	"Take the Colbert challenge, America! Sing the National Anthem to the tune of my theme song! This is The Colbert Report!"	August 9	2101
Stephen places Joe Lieberman's leather chair in the audience, saying he will always have a seat on the show. Stephen runs a campaign ad for Representative Tom DeLay. "Tip of the hat, wag of the finger": wag of the finger to the Middle East crisis for shortening President Bush's vacation; wag of the finger to Ford for recalling vehicles; tip of the hat to J.K. Rowling for possibly killing Harry Potter in the last book ("He's a witch"); wag of the finger to breasts for infiltrating the media during World Brestfeeding Week; tip of the hat to Hungarians for voting to name a new bridge the Chuck Norris Bridge, also suggesting it should rather be named Stephen Colbert bridge. Voting continues until September 10 at http://www.m0hid.gov.hu/szavaz. Guest Robbins tells Stephen he is being a douchebag.
134	"Cappuccino"	Eli Pariser	"The Colbert Report's terror level has been elevated to brown - someone spilled coffee on the chart. This is The Colbert Report!"	August 10	2102
Stephen shows the liquids that he always takes on airplanes, and suggests ways to cope with the new airline security regulations. Better Know A District: California's 6th District and an interview with Rep. Lynn Woolsey. Colbert wrist wrestles Woolsey. In describing the 6th district, Colbert mentions that it contains Skywalker Ranch. In honor of George Lucas, Colbert films green screen footage of himself with a lightsaber that is later remixed by fans as part of his "Green Screen Challenge".
135	"None"	Ramesh Ponnuru	"This message is for my homies back in the hood: We're on for squash tomorrow morning at the club at 8:30. This is The Colbert Report!"	August 14	2103
There is no Wørd for the second time in five episodes (although, the opening headline is "Cease Is The Word"). Stephen laments the cease-fire between Israel and Lebanon, because "we are no longer on the road to World War III." Jon Stewart is added to the new "called out" board until Stewart's "on notice" card is ready - Stewart then shows up in the studio and he and Stephen discuss Jon's "feud" with Geraldo Rivera. After Jon apologizes to Geraldo, he is taken off the "called out" board. Stephen's Sound Advice: Protecting Your Online Identity. Tips: type with your non-dominant hand, pick a password you can't even remember, get hundreds of credit cards, defrag your hard drive, perform fake web searches to "throw people off", and wash your computer once a month to protect it from viruses.
136	"Dumb-ocracy"	David Gergen	"America, I'm throwing my arms in the air and waving them like I just don't care. I'm sorry, I just can't do it - I do care! This is The Colbert Report!"	August 15	2104
Stephen suggests the new name for the Saginaw Spirit hockey team's mascot - the "Colbeagle". Stephen also proposed the naming of a Hungarian bridge after him. He encouraged members of the Colbert Nation to visit http://www.m0hid.gov.hu and then click on the Hungarian word on the left "Szavazok." In the "All You Need to Know" segment, he looked into the Mexican election counting crisis, and "all you need to know" is that the President will be George W. Bush. He called the interview with David Gergen, a moderate Republican, an interview with the Chupacabra.
137	"El Comandante"	Morgan Spurlock	"[quietly] If you can hear this you're too close to your television. [yelling] This is The Colbert Report!"	August 16	2105
Stephen showed a clip of Cuban president Fidel Castro and Venezuelan president Hugo Chávez together on Castro's 80th birthday (August 13). He quoted George W. Bush's intent that the US will go and help the Cuban people in a post Castro era, and cried, 'We are coming for you, Elián!' Stephen's vote on the Hungarian bridge increased and he is officially past Chuck Norris (with a 23,000% increase in votes from 1,774 to 438,049). Fans were encouraged to visit www.colbertnation.com to find a direct link to vote for him. He joked about East Germany's Olympic swimming team, the Wonder Girls, as you would wonder if they were girls.
138	"None"	Neil Young	"Time to take a half-hour break from rockin' in the free world. This is The Colbert Report!"	August 17	2106
No Wørd for the third time in two weeks. Stephen gives an update on the commando team he sent to rescue Stephen Jr. from his cage at the San Francisco Zoo. Stephen has an "I Called It!" balloon drop (similar to when he predicted the Oscars winners) for winning his October 26 "argument" with astronomer Neil deGrasse Tyson that Pluto should remain a planet. Tyson came back on the show to discuss the recent developments and helps Stephen trash-talk new planets Charon, Ceres, and 2003 UB_{313}. Better Know A District: California Rep. Xavier Becerra.
139	"Side Effects"	Geoffrey Nunberg	"Could being a Nielsen family kill you? Watch the entire show to find out. This is The Colbert Report!"	August 21	2107
Stephen shows internet clips of him using a lightsaber that have had monsters and other things edited in by fans. Stephen then introduces the "Green Screen Challenge" - a contest for who can make the best video from footage originally filmed in the August 10 episode. Stephen reveals that he has an intern test everything he puts in his mouth. "Threat Down": Jimmy Carter, grass, orphans, food, and threats. The countdown makes no mention whatsoever of bears, though it does reference snakes.
140	"99 Problems"	Paul Krugman	"I've got the truth on my side - it's one of the advantages of getting to pick first. This is The Colbert Report!"	August 22	2108
Colbert laments over not being awarded a Fields Medal. Upon getting over 17 million votes to name a bridge after him, Stephen salutes Hungary.
141	"None"	Gideon Yago	None ("Oh hi, I didn't see you there" after the credits)	August 23	2109
A Colbert Report Special Report: American Pop Culture: It's Crumbelievable! Damian Kulash from the band OK Go comes on to discuss how and why his band circumvented the "corporate machine." Stephen shows a typical family and how cable television has destroyed their lives.
142	"Bad Boys / HELP!"	Janna Levin	"I still can't get enough of this (sound clip of last night's theme, 'It's crumbelievable!' plays) - This is The Colbert Report!"	August 24	2110
Georgia gets lambasted by Stephen for calling itself the "Peach State" when his home state of South Carolina "kicks Georgia's ass" when it comes to peach production. One segment includes excerpts from an (presumably nonexistent) episode of Morgan Spurlock's TV show 30 Days in which an apolitical slacker has to spend 30 days in the Colbert Report audience. The man becomes a Colbert clone and even starts giving orders to the staff until Stephen has him forcibly removed.

=== September ===
No.	"The Wørd"	Guest(s)	Introductory phrase	Original release date	Prod. code
143	"Shall"	Martin Short	"I've been gone two weeks and I think the kids have had a party in the studio. Smells like weed in here. This is The Colbert Report!"	September 11	2111
Over his two-week vacation, Stephen was up for the Primetime Emmy Award for Outstanding Individual Performance in a Variety or Music Program. Barry Manilow won, but Stephen predicted this outcome on the red carpet which led to an "I called it!" segment. Stephen announces his new Las Vegas revue, Stephen Colbert--Passionately from the Heart: Songs of Love and Opinion. He then comments on the validity of the TV "docudrama" The Path to 9/11. He laughs out-of-character when attempting to say the name of the screenwriter, Cyrus Nowrasteh. Then Stephen jokes back and forth with Martin Short about gays, Barbra Streisand, interviewing celebrities, and Short's show on Broadway, Fame Becomes Me.
144	"Missed Opportunity"	Toby Keith	None. "Stephen Jedi" video intro	September 12	2112
Stephen downs a Hoegaarden Blanche wheat beer in front of New Jersey's 3rd district Democratic candidate Rich Sexton.
145	"Caveat Emptor"	Ken Jennings	"America, I'm about to raise your minimum rage. This is The Colbert Report!"	September 13	2113
Stephen tracks his eagle, Stephen Jr., on www.iws.org. Stephen Jr. ends up in Canada. He then mentions that James Frey, author of A Million Little Pieces, is offering a full refund to those people who bought the book before it was revealed to be partially fictional. This leads to the night's word. Formidable Opponent: Should America set a timetable for withdrawing from Iraq? The segment ends with each Colbert holding a gun to the other's head. Stephen then interviews Ken Jennings regarding his new book, Brainiac: Adventures in the Curious, Competitive, Compulsive World of Trivia Buffs. He attempts to nail Ken by asking him, "Which element has an atomic number 75?" He also asks Ken how many pages are in his book, which Ken can't answer.
146	"None"	Bill Simmons	"If you watch only one Comedy Central show in the next half-hour, make it this one. This is The Colbert Report!"	September 14	2114
Hungarian ambassador to the United States András Simonyi announces that Stephen Colbert won the Northern M0 Danube bridge-naming contest, but in order to actually have the bridge named after him Colbert must be dead; Colbert lambasts NASA for launching Space Shuttle Atlantis instead of sending the president to Mars.
147	"Wiper Fluid"	Will Power	"There's an old saying where I come from: This is The Colbert Report!"	September 18	2115
Stephen Colbert talks about Whitney Houston's break-up, and airs the second installment of The New Adventures of Tek Jansen. He also completes a bust of George W. Bush that is made up of cut-up pieces of the New York Times. Stephen says he'll send it to the New York Times as a piñata, but says that they'll be surprised by what it's filled with.
148	"Tribalism"	Frank Rich	"Some pronounce it 'yee-roh.' Some pronounce it 'gyro.' I pronounce it 'lamb sandwich.' This is America! Speak English! This is The Colbert Report!"	September 19	2116
Threat Down: Al Gore, Toby Keith, Anti-Drug Ads, Irony, Food
149	"Lose"	James Carville	None (a Green Screen Challenge entry was shown instead)	September 20	2117
Who's Not Honoring Me Now; Stephen's Sound Advice on getting through high school.
150	"None"	Daniel Ellsberg	"This is the church, this is the steeple, open the doors, ATTACKED BY AN EAGLE! AW! This is The Colbert Report!"	September 21	2118
Opens with a demand of forgiveness from various Jews. Author Daniel Golden (via satellite) helps Stephen form an opinion on early admission to colleges. Golden immediately calls after the interview to, as a Jew, apologize for the interview, saying he should have made his point clearer. Better Know a District: Paul Aronsohn (D - Candidate) from New Jersey's 5th.
151	"Opposition Party"	Arianna Huffington	"The leaves may be changing, but my opinions never will. This is The Colbert Report!"	September 25	2119
Colbert Report Days of Repentance Hotline [1-888-OOPS-JEW], George Allan's Jewish mother, The Greatest Story Ever Sold getting cockblocked, Geneva Convention Compromise, Green Screen Challenge - Trevor Homer, Colbert Cruise '06.
152	"Good Morning"	Ted Danson	"Facts should be like Sansabelt pants, adjustable to fit your needs. This is The Colbert Report!"	September 26	2120
Frank Rich's book still not #1; The Four Horsemen of the Ap-POP-calypse: Movies, Television, Music, Books; Alpha Dog of the Week: Tom Selleck, possible next President of the NRA.
153	"Iraq"	Lowell Bergman	"America, remember the most important gun safety tip: if you have a gun, you'll be safe. This is The Colbert Report!"	September 27	2121
Mort Zuckerman calls the hotline. Colbert at first cannot remember the word, and goes through it trying to remember. Tip of the Hat: Chevrolet's new Silverado ad, George Clooney Wag of the finger: Bill Cosby and his slave museum, Food Labels Colbert admits there is an Adults-only secret level in his fictional World of Colbertcraft, a play on Grand Theft Auto's Hot Coffee mod.
154	"None"	Steve Wozniak	"Just a reminder, the Colbert Report original cast recording is available on sale in the lobby. This is The Colbert Report!"	September 28	2122
Another entry to the Green Screen challenge is shown. "The Blitzkrieg on Grinchitude" shows an interview with inhabitants of Spencer County, Indiana with the controversy over Santa and Abraham Lincoln being the centerpiece of the town. Jon Stewart is tricked into calling the "Days of Repentance" hotline, followed by Un-American News.

=== October ===
No.	"The Wørd"	Guest(s)	Introductory phrase	Original release date	Prod. code
155	"Copycat"	Michael Lewis	"America, I'm not your normal pundit. I'm fully krausened. This is The Colbert Report."	October 2	2123
Attempts to explain Mark Foley's actions by saying he was using online acronyms such as STUD (Strong Teen Using Democracy) and HORNY (Happy On Reaching New Year's). Stephen talks about Scientists and Engineers for America.
156	"Experience"	Andy Stern	"America, I'm auctioning off this part of the show. Your ad could be here. This is The Colbert Report."	October 3	2124
Colbert compares the platforms that Hillary Clinton and Lucifer would have in a potential election. He also suggests Lucifer be a vice-presidential candidate, with John McCain as the presidential candidate. Colbert announces that Saginaw Spirit has officially named their mini-mascot "Steagle Colbeagle the Eagle." At the end of his show, he declares he had a perfect show and retires his jersey.
157	"Must-Not-See TV"	Byron Dorgan	"Apply directly to the forehead, Apply directly to the forehead, Apply directly to the forehead. This is The Colbert Report."	October 4	2125
Colbert says that the misdeeds by Mark Foley were actually done by Representative Jack Daniels. Colbert gets excited by the Nobel Prize results which has the USA 3/3 of the Nobel Prizes issued and gets excited for a sweep. Announces that a winner will be selected for the Green Screen Challenge on October 11.
158	"None"	Amy Goodman	"Here's the truth you ordered. Watch out, the plate's very hot! This is The Colbert Report!"	October 5	2126
Colbert shows that Massachusetts is an anagram for The Ass Sac Smut. And has special guest Maz Jobrani who urges Arabians to refuse terrorist roles. Colbert provides the idea for Behavioral Profiling (a play on racial profiling). A mini-Better Know a District is done with Mark Foley via textmessage. Colbert is outraged at Starbucks' price increase of a nickel and admits his addiction to Starbucks' five-shot Venti caramel mocha.
159	"Safety"	Randy Newman	"I'm like Wonder Woman, I've got a lasso of truth and a killer bod. This is The Colbert Report."	October 9	2127
Colbert opens the show by speaking in Korean in response to North Korea's nuclear bomb detonations. He then gives an update to the Saginaw Spirit in the Stephen Colbert Sports Update (a parody of ESPN's SportsCenter). The show closes with Randy Newman singing "Political Science."
160	"None"	Ariel Levy	None.	October 10	2128
A Colbert Report Special Report: A Salute to the American lady, which Colbert was forced to do after being involved with some of the interns. Stephen R.A.P.S., Cooks with Feminists (Jane Fonda and Gloria Steinem), and ends by declaring everyone (as well as himself) Mrs. Colbert.
161	"None"	George Lucas	"America, the culture war is like a bar fight, and I'm your broken pool cue. This is The Colbert Report."	October 11	2129
Stephen ends his well-announced Green Screen Challenge- one of the finalists, George L., comes on, but loses to the other finalist by a score of 40.0-39.9; new episode of Tek Jansen. Ahmed Best reprises his role of Jar Jar Binks in George L.'s entry. This is the first episode of The Colbert Report to not have a proper interview.
162	"None"	Brian Schweitzer	"You don't have to be crazy to work here, but it helps me fire you. This is The Colbert Report."	October 12	2130
Better Known a District: Carol Gay(D - Candidate) from New Jersey's 4th.
163	"Russian Dolls"	Barry Scheck	"It's a dog-eat-dog world, and I'm a dog. This is The Colbert Report."	October 16	2131
"Tip of the hat, wag of the finger": Mid-term Elections edition
164	"Irreconcilable Differences"	Richard Dawkins	"I know we've been together for a year now, Nation, but I would still so do you. This is The Colbert Report."	October 17	2132
The one-year anniversary of the Colbert Report. A new descending video screen is installed, the "Judge Tubbs" clip from BKAD is replayed, and Colbert retires the portrait that hung over the studio "fireplace" and places it for auction on eBay. The portrait is replaced by one of him standing next to the old portrait.
165	"Sherlock"	David Kuo	"It's ladies night here on the report... My suit... Half off! This is The Colbert Report."	October 18	2133
Colbert "Calls it!" after hearing that elephant vasectomies are being performed in Africa, referring to his Wikiality episode and tells viewers to look it up in Wikipedia while the screen shows a link to www.wikiality.com instead. Colbert shows a clip of Jeopardy! which he was the answer for the $2000 question in the Pop Culture category. Another episode of Stephen Colbert's Sport Report (Saginaw Spirit still undefeated (6-0) under Steagle Colbeagle's watch). Episode concludes with Colbert explaining Rick Santorum's quote, which compared The Lord of the Rings with Iraq, with action figures.
166	"None"	Peter Agre	"The pen is mightier than the sword... if you shoot that pen out of a gun. This is The Colbert Report."	October 19	2134
Colbert talks about the portrait bidding, in which it reached $99,999,999.00 but restarted after the fake bids were cancelled. Special guest: founder of The Minutemen Project, Jim Gilchrist. Better Know a District (Competitor): New York's 19th District challenger John Hall formerly of the 1970s band Orleans. Colbert sings "Dance With Me" along with Hall.
167	"Shameless"	Barry Manilow	"See you tomorrow night, trick or treaters! Hope you like stationery. This is The Colbert Report!"	October 30	2135
Instead of having a Threatdown, Stephen has a special "GreatDown", celebrating the 109th Congress. Stephen signs a peace treaty with guest Barry Manilow. The agreement ceases hostilities between the two and grants Stephen joint custody of Manilow's Primetime Emmy Award for Outstanding Individual Performance in a Variety or Music Program. In a heart-stopping moment, Stephen sings "I Write the Songs" with Manilow.
168	"Thanks, Gays!"	Tim Robbins	"I'm giving America something better than candy; my opinions. But be careful! Some of them are filled with razor blades. This is The Colbert Report"	October 31	2136
Stephen praises women's slutty Halloween costumes. He announces the winner of the auction of the photo that previously hung over his fireplace. He also gets incredibly scared by a video showing the reality that Nancy Pelosi may become Speaker of the House. He conducts an interview with Log Cabin Republican from the new show Freak Show, who outs many gay Republicans, including Abraham Lincoln.

=== November ===
No.	"The Wørd"	Guest(s)	Introductory phrase	Original release date	Prod. code
169	"Rip-off"	Penn Jillette	"It's the first day of November sweeps, and I'm pregnant!"	November 1	2137
Colbert comments on the botched joke Kerry made on the troops and the removal of his videos on YouTube. Another installment of the Better Know a District (Challenger) with California's 30th's Republican challenger David Nelson Jones. VH1 has opened voting for its "VH1 Big in 06" awards in which Colbert has been nominated in the "Big Breakthrough" category. He laughingly notes that you can vote as many as times you wish, referencing the way fans vote-bombed the M0 bridge naming contest in Hungary.
170	"None"	Ron Reagan	"Call me, Reese Witherspoon. This is The Colbert Report!"	November 2	2138
Colbert displays his new historadocufictionary "Road to 11-7" in the model of "Road to 9-11". Special Guest "P.K. Winsome" (Tim Meadows) talks about Black Republicans and how they get more attention than Black Democrats. Another edition of "Stephen Colbert's Sport Report (pronounced Spor Re-por). He talks about the Saginaw Spirit and offers new items that the Spirit can sell in their gift shop. He talks to the winner of the auction for his former portrait, Chad Walldorf of Stickyfinger's in Charleston, South Carolina. Ron Reagan also gives Colbert a new hairdo, so that Stephen can look even more like his idol, Ronald Reagan.
171	"Happy Ending"	Mark Halperin	"I'm Stephen Colbert, and I approve this message. This is The Colbert Report!"	November 6	2139
Colbert opens the show by commenting on Saddam Hussein's death sentence by hanging and pushes viewers to vote Republican. A net of red balloons are hung above the set, but no blue ones since he felt it wasn't necessary. He notes that if the Republicans don't win the House after the midterm elections, no balloons would be falling. He brings out two children who want a balloon drop and urges people to vote Republican. Colbert then tells the viewers what to expect while voting and ends by having a fireside chat about absentee ballots.
172	"None"	TBA	None	November 7	2140
This episode is an hour-long joint live broadcast with The Daily Show. Colbert has two cakes ready, one for a Republican victory, with a picture of all states in red, and one for a Democratic victory, with a picture of a terrorist. Colbert notes that all incumbents profiled in the Better Know a District segments were reelected. Rep. Robert Wexler and Delegate Eleanor Holmes Norton return as special guests to talk about the Democratic takeover of the House. During this interview, Wexler is very cautious to what he says after Colbert asks him if he would "reach across the aisle" and calls Norton a Republican. Colbert unwillingly declares victory for the Democrats; he then says that he quits the show and storms out the studio, but his limo driver, Uncle Sam, coaxes him to return.
173	"Sigh"	Jeff Greenfield	"I told you America, a hard rain's gonna fall. This is The Colbert Report!"	November 8	2141
A distraught Colbert opens the show by noting that nothing important happened except a strong rain and Britney Spears's breakup with Kevin Federline. In order to alleviate his anger, he strikes a blue donkey piñata with a bat. Stephen is completely silent during the Wørd, during which the bullet points describe his thoughts on the results of the Midterm Elections. Newly elected John Hall, who was profiled in a Better Know a District segment, returns and sings the National Anthem. A new Tek Jansen theme song is unveiled and the episode closes with a montage of the now-dead Republican majority.
174	"Putin 08"	Dean Kamen	"Sorry Cookie Monster, 'C' is for Colbert. This is the eponymous report!"	November 9	2142
Stephen opens with a "Shout Out!" to Michael Rehm (www.cookingsouth.com), a cook at the Amundsen-Scott Station in Antarctica and Colbert fan. The red balloons are finally dropped in an attempt to hide news of the Republican loss from Michael, and this is followed by the "South Pole Minute". During the Wørd, Stephen pushes for U.S. President Putin in 2008. A video segment about the "only" black Republican, "P.K. Winsome: A Journey Home", in which P.K. visits Harlem to rally the GOP base there. Finally, Stephen interviews inventor Dean Kamen while seated in an iBot, a sophisticated wheelchair of Kamen's design.
175	"Back off, old man!"	Dan Rather	"I'm going to drop the truth on you like Denise Richards' laptop on an old lady's head!"	November 13	2143
Stephen starts the episode with reiterating his support for Putin '08. He then urges Senator John McCain to choose life and warns him about the alternative - President Hillary Clinton. Stephen then talks about President Bush bringing in his father's think-tank in to alleviating the situation in Iraq. This leads to the Word: Back off, Old Man! Tip of the Hat, Wag of the Finger (Quitters' edition).
176	"Expecting"	Jeff Swartz	"I just finished my resume. If anyone asks, this show has been on for 30 years. This is The Colbert Report!"	November 14	2144
Stephen is proud to announce that Stephen Jr., an eagle named by the San Diego Zoo, has started on a course back to America after flying to Canada, with extra incentive of Eagle Porn. Colbert then blames the Republican defeat on Gail Parker's annoying jingle, and introduces "Stephen Colbert's Kid Activity Corner" and shows how to make a Nancy Pelosi Hand Turkey.
177	"None"	Al Franken, Mike Novacek	"The days are getting shorter and shorter, and the Democrats have only been in power for a week. This is The Colbert Report!"	November 15	2145
Al Franken gloats about the Democrats' Congressional victory; Franken claims credit for saving Rush Limbaugh's life for calling him a big fat idiot. Better Know a Founder with Thomas Jefferson - three look-alikes, after being judged on their fashion sense by Tim Gunn, compete in America's Top Jefferson. Stephen fights paleontologist Mike Novacek over the existence of dinosaurs.
178	"Play Ball!"	Richard Linklater	"I'm off next week, so savor me like the last rose of summer. This is The Colbert Report."	November 16	2146
Stephen pines for Matthew McConaughey to be reinstated as Sexiest Man Alive, scorns Deck the Halls, Black Christmas, and It's a Wonderful Life, and speaks to Richard Linklater about Fast Food Nation
179	"Jacksquat"	Jim Lehrer	"I'm rested, well-fed and looking for a fight. Are you listening, yet-to-be-named-chairman of the House's intelligence committee? This is the Colbert Report."	November 27	2147
Stephen reiterates that Vladimir Putin should run for President in 2008 and checks his recordings on his TiVo DVR (deleting "The Daily Show"). After the Word, there is a "Threat Down!" on toys. They are the 100 hoops basketball toy, the Barbie: My Scene head model, Target (store), Toys for Tots, and the Nintendo Wii
180	"Ecu-Menace!"	Harry Shearer	"Alright stoners, start your copy of "The Dark Side of the Moon"...now! This is the Colbert Report!"	November 28	2148
Stephen is featured in GQ, then talks about the Pope's visit to Turkey. His staff discovered Colbert County, Alabama and Stephen sent his building manager Tad (Paul Dinello) to go there and open a museum in his honor in a new three-part-series "The Alabama Miracle".
181	"Killing two birds"	Nora Ephron	"Tonight, the show is in...3D! Unless you are watching on a television. This is the Colbert Report!"	November 29	2149
Stephen introduces a new segment called "Who's riding my coattails now?" because he feels ripped off by being included in Jeopardy! and because indie rock band The Decemberists announced a "green screen challenge" like he did months before. Angry about this he asks the viewers to compete in the challenge and edit his lightsaber-challenge into The Decemberists' video. After the Word and the break there is the second part of his new three-part series "The Alabama Miracle", this time featuring the opening of the "Stephen Colbert museum and gift shop".
182	"None"	Mike Lupica	"Hey, TV Land catchphrase contest, try this one on for size: This is the Colbert Report!"	November 30	2150
Stephen talks about candidates for the 2008 presidential election, especially attacking declared candidate Tom Vilsack on his new segment "Vilsack Attack". He then talks about the racist remarks by Michael Richards with P.K. Winsome, his favorite black Republican interviewee. After the break he informs about new merchandise with his name on and then his new three-part series "The Alabama Miracle" concludes with a report on how the museum fails.

=== December ===
No.	"The Wørd"	Guest(s)	Introductory phrase	Original release date	Prod. code
183	"American Orthodox"	Will Wright	"When it comes to mental gymnastics, I'm a 14-year-old Romanian girl. And I'm gonna stick the landing. This is the Colbert Report!"	December 04	2151
It starts with a report on Congressman Brad Sherman of California who married after appearing on the Report. Colbert called for the couple to quickly produce more ShermBots. He also noted the problems in the Christian Coalition, which fired a reverend because he advocated reducing poverty and fighting global warming. The "Blitzkrieg on Grinchitude" features a "Tip of the Hat/Wag of the Finger"—Christmas edition.
184	"Honest Injun"	Steven Levitt	"The truth is contagious - and I haven't washed my hands in days. This is the Colbert Report!"	December 05	2152
Stephen comments on the nomination of Robert Gates and on NASA's plan to colonize the moon. He then comments on how a tribe of Native Americans kicked out one of his members in his Word segment. After the break there is the "Sport Report" with a rant about the Saginaw Spirit, who lost 3 games in a row despite having a mascot named after him.
185	"Words"	John Sexton	"No animals were harmed in the filming of this episode. We tried, but that damn monkey was just too fast. This is the Colbert Report!"	December 06	2153
The show starts with Stephen explaining the new background of his interview table, which is the Birth of Jesus scene (including an additional shepherd to represent himself). He then talks about Dick Cheney's pregnant lesbian daughter and that there might or not have been an order of Colbert's sperm to her address. After the break there is a new "Tek Jansen" episode.
186	"Case Closed"	Elizabeth de la Vega, Francis S. Collins	"Hey Partridge in that pear tree - stop eating all those pears! This is the Colbert Report!"	December 07	2154
Stephen starts by criticizing David Gregory, who "dared" to quote the report of the bipartisan Iraq Study group to Tony Snow. He then tries to argue against the book United States vs. Bush et al. by Elizabeth de la Vega in his "The Word" segment, challenging her to come on the show to defend her arguments; de la Vega appears moments later to talk about it. After the break he announces that "The Decemberists" issued a "guitar playing challenge" against him for his challenge of their "green screen challenge". Stephen accepts their challenge for December 20. Continuing the show he then names John Bolton "Alpha Dog of the Week".
187	"None"	Peter Singer	"Genius is 10% inspiration and 90% respiration. You'd be surprised how many geniuses forget to breathe. This is the Colbert Report!"	December 11	2155
In the beginning he talks about how Rosie O'Donnell's fake Chinese talking has been criticized. He then salutes Jack Kingston who took a stand against the new 5-day-workweek of Congress and talks to him via satellite. After the break there is a "Threat Down!" dealing with threats to Christmas by Britain, Jews, the Police and real Christmas trees (including the statement that bats are a kind of bear).
188	"Casualty of War"	Dan Savage	"America, take off your thinking caps and put on your feeling shoes. This is the Colbert Report!"	December 12	2156
At the beginning he honors Augusto Pinochet, "a fan of the show". His "shout out!" segment talks about two marines who send him a letter and a flag (which was flown in a command mission), to which he and the audience pledge allegiance afterwards. After the break he celebrates "Truthiness" being "Word of the Year 2006" including a release of a replacement page for the "Merriam-Webster's dictionary" with "truthiness" updated (eliminating "try" for space consideration). He then reports on a fast episode of "Better know a district" where he gets to know every new Congressmen in 2 minutes (because Nancy Pelosi said in an interview he would never be able to do all 434 districts) which brought him up to 51 "known" districts.
189	"It's A Small World"	Doris Kearns Goodwin	"Space shuttle astronauts, look down: you can see this from space [points at his abnormally protruding right ear]. This is the Colbert Report!"	December 13	2157
The show starts with Stephen's search for his "son" Stephen junior, an eagle named for him, who ended up in Vancouver. He then talks about how his report (as he claims) got the Seattle-Tacoma Airport to reinstate Christmas trees in the flight lounge.
190	"Clarity"	Daniel Pinchbeck	*tosses coin* "America has won the coin-toss and has elected to receive...the truth! This is the Colbert Report!"	December 14	2158
Stephen opens with a reminder that on December 20 he will face The Decemberists on his show for a guitar-contest. He then continues to talk about how the American public is responsible for the sad state of things in Iraq and the Word deals with conflict diamonds. A new segment "Blood in the water" deals with Bruce Tinsley's arrest and after that Stephen clarifies why his "porn star name" and his "gay porn star name" do not match. The show ends with him writing a letter Congressman Jack Kingston about what he learned this week.
191	"The Draft"	Jack Welch	"It's the season of giving. Only 7 more days for giving people hell for saying Happy Holidays! This is the Colbert Report!"	December 18	2159
Stephen complains about his cold and the non-working drugs he took against it. He then honors people in a new segment called "Profiles in Balls". After the break there is a long interview.
192	"Tit For Tat"	Deepak Chopra	"Six days left to get your Christmas shopping done America. Fifteen-and-a-half (touching his collar), thirty-four (touching his jacket sleeve), This is the Colbert Report!"	December 19	2160
Stephen talks about the Person of the Year (You!) decided by TIME magazine and decides that this means all his viewers (the Colbert Nation) who did what Stephen told them to do. He then talks about Miss USA and her second chance. After the break he shows a clip on how he visited the Kennedy Institute of Politics at Harvard University trying to bring the students to the "right" path.
193	"None"	Chris Funk, Robert Schneider of The Apples in Stereo	Morley Safer replaces Stephen in a parody of the opening of 60 Minutes to announce this episode's main event: the guitar-solo challenge between Stephen and The Decemberists' guitarist Chris Funk.	December 20	2161
The whole episode is used to slowly build up to the guitar-solo-challenge against The Decemberists' guitarist Chris Funk, including a Stephen-friendly performance of "Stephen, Stephen" a song written just days before by Robert Schneider of The Apples in Stereo and a "Shred Down." Stephen – who, after "injuring himself", is replaced by Peter Frampton – wins in a close contest. Other guests include Henry Kissinger, rock critic Anthony DeCurtis, and Governor-elect (of New York) Eliot Spitzer. The end of the show sees Cheap Trick guitarist and Colbert Report theme writer Rick Nielsen lead the other three guitarists and Stephen in a rendition of the theme.

== Notes ==
1. "Truthiness," the first "Wørd of the day" on The Colbert Report, was voted the 2005 Word of the Year by the American Dialect Society, which credited The Colbert Report for introducing it into the popular vernacular. For more information, see truthiness.
2. The word "overrated" was used in reference to the late Rosa Parks.
3. The word "quitter" was used in reference to Harriet Miers withdrawing her nomination to the U.S. Supreme Court.
4. The word "cat" was used in reference to The New York Times misreporting Colbert's first wørd, "Truthiness," as "Trustiness." He explained that the Times should have an easier time with this word.
5. The word "hoser" was used in reference to Canada.
6. The word "TO" was used in reference to Terrell Owens and/or "totally obnoxious" — "same difference."
7. This Wørd of the day, "The Orient," was changed to "Asia" for political correctness.
8. The word "Never" was used to answer the question of when to withdraw from Iraq.
9. The word "Spectacle" was used in regards to capital punishment.
10. Although Colbert originally said "Hell, no!" when giving the Wørd of the day, it appeared on the screen initially as "Hell, Yes!" It then quickly switched to "Hell, No!" after this intentional "error."
11. The word "Travolta" was used in reference to John Travolta's role in The Boy in the Plastic Bubble.
12. On the January 9, 2006, episode, there was no Wørd of the day because Jack Abramoff pleading guilty to a number of felony criminal charges was said to present no issue, and thus no story. However, the segment still proceeded as usual, just without any "theme" word; the lack of a word itself became the theme.
13. The word "¡Cerrado!" was in reference to the U.S. borders, with Colbert recommending a wall built not just along the Mexico–US border but also along the Canada–US border and the East and West coasts, and with a dome covering everything inside.
14. The word "Old School" was used in reference to the purportedly vengeful style of the God of the Old Testament.
15. The word "smarterer" was used to describe a condition better than being smarter, by being "smarter" at subjects like religion which Colbert identified as being more important than traditional school subjects like math and science; Colbert responded to reports of overseas students outscoring American students at core school subjects by seeking to become "smarterer", such as by learning that the answer to every question in science class is that "God did it."
16. The word Public-See was punned as a humorous antonym of Privacy.
17. Stephen follows a mistake by Carl Zimmer, who mistakenly gives the name "Edward Colbert" in his original article for The New York Times.
18. The word "Jesi" was used to refer to more than one Jesus.
19. The word "U.S.A.? U.S.A.?" was used to signify Colbert's disappointment with the U.S. Olympic team in contrast to his word "U.S.A.! U.S.A.!" on February 9, 2006.
20. The phrase translates into English as "Let the Good Times Roll", though Colbert declares that it translates to "Show us your tits."
21. The word "Martyr" was used to refer to "The death of Tom DeLay's political career."
22. The word "Save It" was used as in "Save your breath" in reference to arguments about Global warming.
23. Introductory phrase from Bart Simpson, Jimmie Walker, Henry Winkler as Fonzie, and Gary Coleman as Arnold Jackson.
24. The word "Bard" was used "As in, these kids should be bard up in jail", in reference to juvenile rehabilitation.
25. The phrase "Drug-Fueled Sex Crime" was a suggestion to politically active celebrities such as George Clooney to have one so they can "slink off" and "just say no to political action."
26. The word "Lunchables" was used to describe how "America should be, in hermetically sealed, individual spaces."
27. The opening line refers to the song "I Touch Myself" by Divinyls.
28. As the result, many people act upon his instructions and vandalize Wikipedia, with the result that certain articles, including "Elephant", "Oregon", "George Washington", "Latchkey kid", "Serial killer", "Hitler", "The Colbert Report" and "Stephen Colbert" are/were temporarily protected.
29. The WØRD segment on August 16, 2006, was done as La PALABRA (with the Ø slash through the second A) by Colbert's Mexican equivalent, Esteban.
30. An audience member transformed into a Colbert Report fanatic on 30 Days invoked several recurring elements. The WØRD "HELP!" was triggered as the man was being led out by security.
