= Spokane, Portland and Seattle class L-3 =

L-3
Type and origin
- Power type: Steam
- Builder: Cooke Works
- Build date: September 1886
Specifications
- Configuration
  - Whyte: 4-4-0
- Gauge: 4 ft 8 1/2 in (1,435 mm)
- Driver dia.: 57 in (1,400 mm)
- Adhesive weight: 42,600 lb (19,300 kg)
- Loco weight: 65,000 lb (29,000 kg)
- Fuel type: Oil
- Boiler pressure: 135 lbf/in²
- Cylinders: 2
- Cylinder size: 15 in × 22 in (380 mm × 560 mm)
Performance figures
- Tractive effort: 9,965 lbf
Career
- Operators: Spokane, Portland and Seattle Railway
- Class: L-3
- Numbers: 52
- Locale: United States
- Disposition: Sold to E. Turney on October 15, 1919

Spokane, Portland and Seattle Railway's Class L-3 was a class of 4-4-0 steam locomotives.
