= Level 3 =

Level 3 may refer to:

== Music ==
- Level 3 (Last Chance to Reason album), 2013
- Level3 (Perfume album), 2013

== Technology ==
- Biosafety level 3, a containment procedure for dangerous biological materials
- Keyboard level 3, usually consisting of a set of characters input using the AltGr key
- Level 3 driving automation in an autonomous car
- Level III data of the U.S. National Weather Service's NEXRAD weather radar
- Level 3 charging, also known as DC fast charging, supports charging up to 500 volts.

== Other ==
- Level 3 (TV series), an Australian television series about video games
- Level 3 Communications, an Internet service provider
- An academic qualification, such as:
  - Business and Technology Education Council#School leaving qualification (Level 3)
- Level 3 coronavirus restrictions, see COVID-19 pandemic in Scotland#Levels System
- STANAG 4569 protection level
