= I'll =

I'll may refer to:

- "I'll", meaning "I will" or "I shall", a contraction (grammar)
- I'll (manga)
- "I'll", a song by Band-Maid from Unleash
- "I'll", a song by Dir En Grey
- I'll (singer), South Korean singer
