= 3L =

3L or 3-L may refer to:

- 3L, or Economic Synergy, a political group in Hong Kong
- Third (final) year law school student in the United States
- 3L, IATA code of Air Arabia Abu Dhabi
- 3L, then IATA code of InterSky which operated until 2015
- Federal Election Commission (FEC) Form 3L, or Report of Contributions Bundled by Lobbyists, in which federal campaigns and committees must disclose certain contributions received to the FEC at regular intervals
- 3L, a model of the 4-cylinder diesel Toyota L engine
- Ford 3L GT or F3L, a sports prototype racing car model introduced in March 1968
- Bentley 3L or Bentley 3 Litre, a 1920s sports car
- SSH 3L or Secondary State Highway 3L, a road which became Washington State Route 126
- Lupo 3L, a model of the Volkswagen Lupo automobile
- SEAT Arosa 3L, a model of the SEAT Arosa automobile
- Curtiss HS-3L, a single-engined patrol flying boat built for the United States Navy during World War I

== See also ==
- L3 (disambiguation)
