= LLLL =

Japanese musician

Kazuto Okawa, known professionally as LLLL (pronounced "four-el"), is a Japanese musician. The Japan Times described his music as "sparkly, J-pop-inflected brand of shoegaze", and PopMatters described it as "post-electropop". He released his first album in 2012. He released his second album Faithful in 2015 through Progressive Form. That same year he released a remix of Meishi Smile's "Pastel".
