= Blow My Mind (disambiguation) =

"Blow My Mind" is a 2019 song by Davido featuring Chris Brown.

Blow My Mind may also refer to:

- "Blow My Mind", a 2002 song by Robyn from the album Don't Stop the Music
- "Blow My Mind", a 2005 song by Big & Rich from the album Comin' to Your City
