= Lock 'n' Load (duo) =

Dutch Band

- Origin: The Netherlands
- Genres: EDM
- Years active: 1999–
- Labels: RCA; BMG
- Past members: Frank van Rooijen; Niels Pijpers; Andre Frauenstein

Lock 'n' Load were a Dutch dance duo consisting of Frank van Rooijen and Niels Pijpers. Andre Frauenstein joined the duo in July 2011. They are best known for their 1999 debut single "Blow Ya Mind". "Blow Ya Mind" was remixed and re-released in 2011.

== Discography ==
=== Charting singles ===
List of singles, with selected chart positions
Title	Year	Chart positions			
Title	Year	NLD	AUS	GER	UK
"Blow Ya Mind"	1999	97	45	98	6
"House Some More"	2000	67	—	—	45
